

79001–79100 

|-bgcolor=#fefefe
| 79001 || 2749 P-L || — || September 24, 1960 || Palomar || PLS || — || align=right | 1.4 km || 
|-id=002 bgcolor=#fefefe
| 79002 || 2774 P-L || — || September 24, 1960 || Palomar || PLS || NYS || align=right | 1.5 km || 
|-id=003 bgcolor=#fefefe
| 79003 || 3519 P-L || — || October 17, 1960 || Palomar || PLS || — || align=right | 1.7 km || 
|-id=004 bgcolor=#fefefe
| 79004 || 4134 P-L || — || September 24, 1960 || Palomar || PLS || FLO || align=right | 1.2 km || 
|-id=005 bgcolor=#E9E9E9
| 79005 || 4220 P-L || — || September 24, 1960 || Palomar || PLS || — || align=right | 4.7 km || 
|-id=006 bgcolor=#E9E9E9
| 79006 || 4261 P-L || — || September 24, 1960 || Palomar || PLS || HOF || align=right | 6.1 km || 
|-id=007 bgcolor=#fefefe
| 79007 || 4289 P-L || — || September 24, 1960 || Palomar || PLS || — || align=right | 1.8 km || 
|-id=008 bgcolor=#E9E9E9
| 79008 || 4306 P-L || — || September 24, 1960 || Palomar || PLS || — || align=right | 2.5 km || 
|-id=009 bgcolor=#fefefe
| 79009 || 4707 P-L || — || September 24, 1960 || Palomar || PLS || NYS || align=right | 1.4 km || 
|-id=010 bgcolor=#d6d6d6
| 79010 || 4851 P-L || — || September 24, 1960 || Palomar || PLS || — || align=right | 6.7 km || 
|-id=011 bgcolor=#fefefe
| 79011 || 6312 P-L || — || September 24, 1960 || Palomar || PLS || — || align=right | 1.7 km || 
|-id=012 bgcolor=#fefefe
| 79012 || 6678 P-L || — || September 24, 1960 || Palomar || PLS || — || align=right | 2.0 km || 
|-id=013 bgcolor=#fefefe
| 79013 || 9056 P-L || — || October 17, 1960 || Palomar || PLS || — || align=right | 1.9 km || 
|-id=014 bgcolor=#fefefe
| 79014 || 9520 P-L || — || October 17, 1960 || Palomar || PLS || NYS || align=right | 4.4 km || 
|-id=015 bgcolor=#d6d6d6
| 79015 || 9548 P-L || — || October 17, 1960 || Palomar || PLS || — || align=right | 5.0 km || 
|-id=016 bgcolor=#fefefe
| 79016 || 2094 T-1 || — || March 25, 1971 || Palomar || PLS || — || align=right | 1.3 km || 
|-id=017 bgcolor=#fefefe
| 79017 || 2117 T-1 || — || March 25, 1971 || Palomar || PLS || NYS || align=right | 1.8 km || 
|-id=018 bgcolor=#d6d6d6
| 79018 || 2126 T-1 || — || March 25, 1971 || Palomar || PLS || THM || align=right | 6.5 km || 
|-id=019 bgcolor=#fefefe
| 79019 || 1071 T-2 || — || September 29, 1973 || Palomar || PLS || V || align=right | 1.6 km || 
|-id=020 bgcolor=#fefefe
| 79020 || 1085 T-2 || — || September 29, 1973 || Palomar || PLS || NYS || align=right data-sort-value="0.90" | 900 m || 
|-id=021 bgcolor=#fefefe
| 79021 || 1160 T-2 || — || September 29, 1973 || Palomar || PLS || — || align=right | 1.7 km || 
|-id=022 bgcolor=#E9E9E9
| 79022 || 1200 T-2 || — || September 29, 1973 || Palomar || PLS || — || align=right | 3.7 km || 
|-id=023 bgcolor=#fefefe
| 79023 || 1213 T-2 || — || September 29, 1973 || Palomar || PLS || — || align=right | 1.3 km || 
|-id=024 bgcolor=#fefefe
| 79024 || 1247 T-2 || — || September 29, 1973 || Palomar || PLS || NYS || align=right | 1.1 km || 
|-id=025 bgcolor=#E9E9E9
| 79025 || 1318 T-2 || — || September 29, 1973 || Palomar || PLS || — || align=right | 2.0 km || 
|-id=026 bgcolor=#fefefe
| 79026 || 1322 T-2 || — || September 29, 1973 || Palomar || PLS || — || align=right | 1.6 km || 
|-id=027 bgcolor=#d6d6d6
| 79027 || 1337 T-2 || — || September 29, 1973 || Palomar || PLS || THM || align=right | 7.4 km || 
|-id=028 bgcolor=#d6d6d6
| 79028 || 1441 T-2 || — || September 29, 1973 || Palomar || PLS || — || align=right | 4.7 km || 
|-id=029 bgcolor=#fefefe
| 79029 || 1503 T-2 || — || September 29, 1973 || Palomar || PLS || NYS || align=right | 2.6 km || 
|-id=030 bgcolor=#fefefe
| 79030 || 2027 T-2 || — || September 29, 1973 || Palomar || PLS || NYS || align=right | 1.3 km || 
|-id=031 bgcolor=#d6d6d6
| 79031 || 2073 T-2 || — || September 29, 1973 || Palomar || PLS || — || align=right | 7.9 km || 
|-id=032 bgcolor=#E9E9E9
| 79032 || 2134 T-2 || — || September 29, 1973 || Palomar || PLS || — || align=right | 2.8 km || 
|-id=033 bgcolor=#d6d6d6
| 79033 || 2185 T-2 || — || September 29, 1973 || Palomar || PLS || THM || align=right | 6.5 km || 
|-id=034 bgcolor=#fefefe
| 79034 || 2228 T-2 || — || September 29, 1973 || Palomar || PLS || NYS || align=right | 1.2 km || 
|-id=035 bgcolor=#d6d6d6
| 79035 || 2247 T-2 || — || September 29, 1973 || Palomar || PLS || KAR || align=right | 4.3 km || 
|-id=036 bgcolor=#E9E9E9
| 79036 || 3063 T-2 || — || September 30, 1973 || Palomar || PLS || MAR || align=right | 4.0 km || 
|-id=037 bgcolor=#fefefe
| 79037 || 3116 T-2 || — || September 30, 1973 || Palomar || PLS || MAS || align=right | 1.6 km || 
|-id=038 bgcolor=#fefefe
| 79038 || 3144 T-2 || — || September 30, 1973 || Palomar || PLS || — || align=right | 1.2 km || 
|-id=039 bgcolor=#fefefe
| 79039 || 3169 T-2 || — || September 30, 1973 || Palomar || PLS || — || align=right | 2.0 km || 
|-id=040 bgcolor=#fefefe
| 79040 || 3196 T-2 || — || September 30, 1973 || Palomar || PLS || NYS || align=right | 1.3 km || 
|-id=041 bgcolor=#fefefe
| 79041 || 3234 T-2 || — || September 30, 1973 || Palomar || PLS || NYS || align=right | 1.6 km || 
|-id=042 bgcolor=#E9E9E9
| 79042 || 3249 T-2 || — || September 30, 1973 || Palomar || PLS || — || align=right | 2.7 km || 
|-id=043 bgcolor=#fefefe
| 79043 || 3330 T-2 || — || September 25, 1973 || Palomar || PLS || — || align=right | 1.5 km || 
|-id=044 bgcolor=#fefefe
| 79044 || 3919 T-2 || — || September 30, 1973 || Palomar || PLS || ERI || align=right | 3.7 km || 
|-id=045 bgcolor=#d6d6d6
| 79045 || 4071 T-2 || — || September 29, 1973 || Palomar || PLS || — || align=right | 3.5 km || 
|-id=046 bgcolor=#E9E9E9
| 79046 || 4113 T-2 || — || September 29, 1973 || Palomar || PLS || — || align=right | 3.4 km || 
|-id=047 bgcolor=#fefefe
| 79047 || 4184 T-2 || — || September 29, 1973 || Palomar || PLS || — || align=right | 3.8 km || 
|-id=048 bgcolor=#fefefe
| 79048 || 4200 T-2 || — || September 29, 1973 || Palomar || PLS || NYS || align=right | 1.2 km || 
|-id=049 bgcolor=#E9E9E9
| 79049 || 4207 T-2 || — || September 29, 1973 || Palomar || PLS || — || align=right | 2.6 km || 
|-id=050 bgcolor=#E9E9E9
| 79050 || 4649 T-2 || — || September 30, 1973 || Palomar || PLS || EUN || align=right | 4.1 km || 
|-id=051 bgcolor=#fefefe
| 79051 || 5091 T-2 || — || September 25, 1973 || Palomar || PLS || V || align=right | 1.2 km || 
|-id=052 bgcolor=#E9E9E9
| 79052 || 5142 T-2 || — || September 25, 1973 || Palomar || PLS || — || align=right | 4.0 km || 
|-id=053 bgcolor=#fefefe
| 79053 || 5153 T-2 || — || September 25, 1973 || Palomar || PLS || V || align=right | 1.4 km || 
|-id=054 bgcolor=#E9E9E9
| 79054 || 1046 T-3 || — || October 17, 1977 || Palomar || PLS || — || align=right | 2.7 km || 
|-id=055 bgcolor=#d6d6d6
| 79055 || 1063 T-3 || — || October 17, 1977 || Palomar || PLS || EOS || align=right | 4.3 km || 
|-id=056 bgcolor=#fefefe
| 79056 || 1132 T-3 || — || October 17, 1977 || Palomar || PLS || — || align=right | 2.0 km || 
|-id=057 bgcolor=#fefefe
| 79057 || 1183 T-3 || — || October 17, 1977 || Palomar || PLS || FLO || align=right | 1.4 km || 
|-id=058 bgcolor=#E9E9E9
| 79058 || 1215 T-3 || — || October 17, 1977 || Palomar || PLS || — || align=right | 3.6 km || 
|-id=059 bgcolor=#d6d6d6
| 79059 || 2014 T-3 || — || October 16, 1977 || Palomar || PLS || — || align=right | 4.7 km || 
|-id=060 bgcolor=#E9E9E9
| 79060 || 2281 T-3 || — || October 16, 1977 || Palomar || PLS || — || align=right | 2.3 km || 
|-id=061 bgcolor=#fefefe
| 79061 || 2286 T-3 || — || October 16, 1977 || Palomar || PLS || V || align=right | 1.3 km || 
|-id=062 bgcolor=#fefefe
| 79062 || 2449 T-3 || — || October 16, 1977 || Palomar || PLS || — || align=right | 1.5 km || 
|-id=063 bgcolor=#d6d6d6
| 79063 || 2499 T-3 || — || October 16, 1977 || Palomar || PLS || — || align=right | 4.7 km || 
|-id=064 bgcolor=#E9E9E9
| 79064 || 2536 T-3 || — || October 17, 1977 || Palomar || PLS || — || align=right | 2.9 km || 
|-id=065 bgcolor=#fefefe
| 79065 || 3102 T-3 || — || October 16, 1977 || Palomar || PLS || MAS || align=right | 3.5 km || 
|-id=066 bgcolor=#fefefe
| 79066 || 3172 T-3 || — || October 16, 1977 || Palomar || PLS || MAS || align=right | 1.1 km || 
|-id=067 bgcolor=#d6d6d6
| 79067 || 3221 T-3 || — || October 16, 1977 || Palomar || PLS || KOR || align=right | 3.6 km || 
|-id=068 bgcolor=#fefefe
| 79068 || 3258 T-3 || — || October 16, 1977 || Palomar || PLS || — || align=right | 1.6 km || 
|-id=069 bgcolor=#fefefe
| 79069 || 3275 T-3 || — || October 16, 1977 || Palomar || PLS || NYS || align=right | 1.1 km || 
|-id=070 bgcolor=#d6d6d6
| 79070 || 3282 T-3 || — || October 16, 1977 || Palomar || PLS || — || align=right | 4.6 km || 
|-id=071 bgcolor=#d6d6d6
| 79071 || 3300 T-3 || — || October 16, 1977 || Palomar || PLS || KOR || align=right | 5.9 km || 
|-id=072 bgcolor=#E9E9E9
| 79072 || 3337 T-3 || — || October 16, 1977 || Palomar || PLS || — || align=right | 3.1 km || 
|-id=073 bgcolor=#fefefe
| 79073 || 3410 T-3 || — || October 16, 1977 || Palomar || PLS || MAS || align=right | 1.5 km || 
|-id=074 bgcolor=#d6d6d6
| 79074 || 3530 T-3 || — || October 16, 1977 || Palomar || PLS || KOR || align=right | 3.3 km || 
|-id=075 bgcolor=#fefefe
| 79075 || 3704 T-3 || — || October 16, 1977 || Palomar || PLS || MAS || align=right | 1.3 km || 
|-id=076 bgcolor=#fefefe
| 79076 || 3782 T-3 || — || October 16, 1977 || Palomar || PLS || NYS || align=right | 1.00 km || 
|-id=077 bgcolor=#fefefe
| 79077 || 4122 T-3 || — || October 16, 1977 || Palomar || PLS || NYS || align=right | 1.4 km || 
|-id=078 bgcolor=#fefefe
| 79078 || 4188 T-3 || — || October 16, 1977 || Palomar || PLS || FLO || align=right | 3.3 km || 
|-id=079 bgcolor=#fefefe
| 79079 || 4302 T-3 || — || October 16, 1977 || Palomar || PLS || — || align=right | 1.5 km || 
|-id=080 bgcolor=#fefefe
| 79080 || 4502 T-3 || — || October 16, 1977 || Palomar || PLS || — || align=right | 1.9 km || 
|-id=081 bgcolor=#fefefe
| 79081 || 4673 T-3 || — || October 17, 1977 || Palomar || PLS || V || align=right | 1.2 km || 
|-id=082 bgcolor=#fefefe
| 79082 || 5047 T-3 || — || October 16, 1977 || Palomar || PLS || — || align=right | 1.6 km || 
|-id=083 bgcolor=#E9E9E9
| 79083 || 5068 T-3 || — || October 16, 1977 || Palomar || PLS || ADE || align=right | 3.7 km || 
|-id=084 bgcolor=#fefefe
| 79084 || 5650 T-3 || — || October 16, 1977 || Palomar || PLS || — || align=right | 2.3 km || 
|-id=085 bgcolor=#fefefe
| 79085 ||  || — || September 30, 1975 || Palomar || S. J. Bus || — || align=right | 2.5 km || 
|-id=086 bgcolor=#E9E9E9
| 79086 Gorgasali || 1977 RD ||  || September 4, 1977 || La Silla || R. M. West || PAL || align=right | 3.3 km || 
|-id=087 bgcolor=#E9E9E9
| 79087 Scheidt ||  ||  || October 17, 1977 || Tautenburg Observatory || F. Börngen || EUN || align=right | 3.4 km || 
|-id=088 bgcolor=#fefefe
| 79088 ||  || — || November 7, 1978 || Palomar || E. F. Helin, S. J. Bus || FLO || align=right | 1.8 km || 
|-id=089 bgcolor=#fefefe
| 79089 ||  || — || November 7, 1978 || Palomar || E. F. Helin, S. J. Bus || — || align=right | 1.4 km || 
|-id=090 bgcolor=#E9E9E9
| 79090 ||  || — || June 25, 1979 || Siding Spring || E. F. Helin, S. J. Bus || — || align=right | 6.5 km || 
|-id=091 bgcolor=#fefefe
| 79091 ||  || — || July 24, 1979 || Siding Spring || S. J. Bus || V || align=right | 1.6 km || 
|-id=092 bgcolor=#E9E9E9
| 79092 ||  || — || February 28, 1981 || Siding Spring || S. J. Bus || CLO || align=right | 6.3 km || 
|-id=093 bgcolor=#fefefe
| 79093 ||  || — || March 1, 1981 || Siding Spring || S. J. Bus || FLO || align=right | 1.3 km || 
|-id=094 bgcolor=#E9E9E9
| 79094 ||  || — || March 1, 1981 || Siding Spring || S. J. Bus || — || align=right | 4.8 km || 
|-id=095 bgcolor=#E9E9E9
| 79095 ||  || — || March 1, 1981 || Siding Spring || S. J. Bus || — || align=right | 5.2 km || 
|-id=096 bgcolor=#d6d6d6
| 79096 ||  || — || March 2, 1981 || Siding Spring || S. J. Bus || HIL3:2 || align=right | 9.7 km || 
|-id=097 bgcolor=#d6d6d6
| 79097 ||  || — || March 7, 1981 || Siding Spring || S. J. Bus || SHU3:2 || align=right | 11 km || 
|-id=098 bgcolor=#fefefe
| 79098 ||  || — || March 2, 1981 || Siding Spring || S. J. Bus || — || align=right | 1.8 km || 
|-id=099 bgcolor=#E9E9E9
| 79099 ||  || — || March 1, 1981 || Siding Spring || S. J. Bus || — || align=right | 5.7 km || 
|-id=100 bgcolor=#d6d6d6
| 79100 ||  || — || March 2, 1981 || Siding Spring || S. J. Bus || — || align=right | 4.7 km || 
|}

79101–79200 

|-bgcolor=#fefefe
| 79101 ||  || — || March 2, 1981 || Siding Spring || S. J. Bus || — || align=right | 1.8 km || 
|-id=102 bgcolor=#fefefe
| 79102 ||  || — || March 2, 1981 || Siding Spring || S. J. Bus || — || align=right | 4.2 km || 
|-id=103 bgcolor=#E9E9E9
| 79103 ||  || — || March 7, 1981 || Siding Spring || S. J. Bus || — || align=right | 4.7 km || 
|-id=104 bgcolor=#E9E9E9
| 79104 ||  || — || March 1, 1981 || Siding Spring || S. J. Bus || WIT || align=right | 1.9 km || 
|-id=105 bgcolor=#E9E9E9
| 79105 ||  || — || March 1, 1981 || Siding Spring || S. J. Bus || HOF || align=right | 6.1 km || 
|-id=106 bgcolor=#fefefe
| 79106 ||  || — || March 2, 1981 || Siding Spring || S. J. Bus || — || align=right | 1.8 km || 
|-id=107 bgcolor=#fefefe
| 79107 ||  || — || March 1, 1981 || Siding Spring || S. J. Bus || — || align=right | 1.4 km || 
|-id=108 bgcolor=#E9E9E9
| 79108 ||  || — || March 1, 1981 || Siding Spring || S. J. Bus || NEM || align=right | 4.5 km || 
|-id=109 bgcolor=#E9E9E9
| 79109 ||  || — || March 2, 1981 || Siding Spring || S. J. Bus || AGN || align=right | 2.5 km || 
|-id=110 bgcolor=#E9E9E9
| 79110 ||  || — || March 2, 1981 || Siding Spring || S. J. Bus || HNA || align=right | 4.3 km || 
|-id=111 bgcolor=#E9E9E9
| 79111 ||  || — || March 2, 1981 || Siding Spring || S. J. Bus || CLO || align=right | 6.0 km || 
|-id=112 bgcolor=#d6d6d6
| 79112 ||  || — || March 2, 1981 || Siding Spring || S. J. Bus || — || align=right | 4.5 km || 
|-id=113 bgcolor=#d6d6d6
| 79113 ||  || — || March 1, 1981 || Siding Spring || S. J. Bus || — || align=right | 5.8 km || 
|-id=114 bgcolor=#E9E9E9
| 79114 ||  || — || March 2, 1981 || Siding Spring || S. J. Bus || — || align=right | 4.9 km || 
|-id=115 bgcolor=#E9E9E9
| 79115 || 1984 JK || — || May 9, 1984 || Palomar || J. Gibson || — || align=right | 2.1 km || 
|-id=116 bgcolor=#fefefe
| 79116 ||  || — || September 27, 1984 || La Silla || H. Debehogne || — || align=right | 3.5 km || 
|-id=117 bgcolor=#fefefe
| 79117 Brydonejack ||  ||  || August 16, 1988 || Palomar || C. S. Shoemaker, E. M. Shoemaker || — || align=right | 1.8 km || 
|-id=118 bgcolor=#d6d6d6
| 79118 ||  || — || April 5, 1989 || La Silla || E. W. Elst || TEL || align=right | 4.7 km || 
|-id=119 bgcolor=#d6d6d6
| 79119 ||  || — || September 26, 1989 || La Silla || H. Debehogne || URS || align=right | 9.7 km || 
|-id=120 bgcolor=#E9E9E9
| 79120 ||  || — || October 7, 1989 || La Silla || E. W. Elst || — || align=right | 5.7 km || 
|-id=121 bgcolor=#fefefe
| 79121 ||  || — || March 2, 1990 || La Silla || E. W. Elst || — || align=right | 2.0 km || 
|-id=122 bgcolor=#fefefe
| 79122 ||  || — || September 14, 1990 || La Silla || H. Debehogne || NYS || align=right | 2.4 km || 
|-id=123 bgcolor=#fefefe
| 79123 ||  || — || September 15, 1990 || La Silla || H. Debehogne || — || align=right | 1.9 km || 
|-id=124 bgcolor=#fefefe
| 79124 ||  || — || September 15, 1990 || La Silla || H. Debehogne || NYS || align=right | 2.1 km || 
|-id=125 bgcolor=#d6d6d6
| 79125 ||  || — || September 22, 1990 || La Silla || E. W. Elst || THM || align=right | 7.3 km || 
|-id=126 bgcolor=#fefefe
| 79126 ||  || — || September 22, 1990 || La Silla || E. W. Elst || NYS || align=right | 2.0 km || 
|-id=127 bgcolor=#fefefe
| 79127 ||  || — || September 22, 1990 || La Silla || E. W. Elst || NYS || align=right | 3.5 km || 
|-id=128 bgcolor=#fefefe
| 79128 ||  || — || September 22, 1990 || La Silla || H. Debehogne || — || align=right | 2.0 km || 
|-id=129 bgcolor=#fefefe
| 79129 Robkoldewey ||  ||  || October 11, 1990 || Tautenburg Observatory || F. Börngen, L. D. Schmadel || NYS || align=right | 2.4 km || 
|-id=130 bgcolor=#fefefe
| 79130 Bandanomori ||  ||  || October 26, 1990 || Geisei || T. Seki || — || align=right | 3.6 km || 
|-id=131 bgcolor=#fefefe
| 79131 ||  || — || October 16, 1990 || La Silla || E. W. Elst || PHO || align=right | 2.2 km || 
|-id=132 bgcolor=#d6d6d6
| 79132 ||  || — || November 15, 1990 || La Silla || E. W. Elst || — || align=right | 11 km || 
|-id=133 bgcolor=#E9E9E9
| 79133 ||  || — || November 15, 1990 || La Silla || E. W. Elst || — || align=right | 1.9 km || 
|-id=134 bgcolor=#E9E9E9
| 79134 ||  || — || November 15, 1990 || La Silla || E. W. Elst || — || align=right | 2.4 km || 
|-id=135 bgcolor=#fefefe
| 79135 || 1991 JV || — || May 8, 1991 || Kitt Peak || Spacewatch || H || align=right | 1.4 km || 
|-id=136 bgcolor=#fefefe
| 79136 ||  || — || July 8, 1991 || La Silla || H. Debehogne || NYS || align=right | 1.7 km || 
|-id=137 bgcolor=#FA8072
| 79137 ||  || — || August 6, 1991 || Palomar || H. E. Holt || — || align=right | 2.2 km || 
|-id=138 bgcolor=#fefefe
| 79138 Mansfeld ||  ||  || September 13, 1991 || Tautenburg Observatory || F. Börngen, L. D. Schmadel || NYS || align=right | 1.6 km || 
|-id=139 bgcolor=#fefefe
| 79139 || 1991 SP || — || September 30, 1991 || Siding Spring || R. H. McNaught || FLO || align=right | 2.6 km || 
|-id=140 bgcolor=#d6d6d6
| 79140 ||  || — || September 29, 1991 || Kitt Peak || Spacewatch || — || align=right | 5.2 km || 
|-id=141 bgcolor=#fefefe
| 79141 || 1991 TB || — || October 1, 1991 || Siding Spring || R. H. McNaught || — || align=right | 2.3 km || 
|-id=142 bgcolor=#fefefe
| 79142 ||  || — || November 1, 1991 || Palomar || E. F. Helin || PHO || align=right | 2.7 km || 
|-id=143 bgcolor=#fefefe
| 79143 ||  || — || January 30, 1992 || La Silla || E. W. Elst || SUL || align=right | 3.9 km || 
|-id=144 bgcolor=#E9E9E9
| 79144 Cervantes ||  ||  || February 2, 1992 || La Silla || E. W. Elst || BAR || align=right | 4.4 km || 
|-id=145 bgcolor=#d6d6d6
| 79145 ||  || — || March 2, 1992 || La Silla || UESAC || ALA || align=right | 7.4 km || 
|-id=146 bgcolor=#E9E9E9
| 79146 ||  || — || May 2, 1992 || La Silla || H. Debehogne || — || align=right | 2.5 km || 
|-id=147 bgcolor=#E9E9E9
| 79147 ||  || — || September 2, 1992 || La Silla || E. W. Elst || JUN || align=right | 2.2 km || 
|-id=148 bgcolor=#E9E9E9
| 79148 ||  || — || September 24, 1992 || Kitt Peak || Spacewatch || HNA || align=right | 4.2 km || 
|-id=149 bgcolor=#fefefe
| 79149 Kajigamori ||  ||  || October 27, 1992 || Geisei || T. Seki || — || align=right | 2.1 km || 
|-id=150 bgcolor=#FA8072
| 79150 ||  || — || October 23, 1992 || Kitt Peak || Spacewatch || — || align=right | 1.3 km || 
|-id=151 bgcolor=#fefefe
| 79151 ||  || — || December 24, 1992 || Kitt Peak || Spacewatch || ERI || align=right | 3.4 km || 
|-id=152 bgcolor=#fefefe
| 79152 Abukumagawa ||  ||  || March 17, 1993 || Geisei || T. Seki || — || align=right | 2.4 km || 
|-id=153 bgcolor=#fefefe
| 79153 ||  || — || March 17, 1993 || La Silla || UESAC || NYS || align=right | 1.3 km || 
|-id=154 bgcolor=#fefefe
| 79154 ||  || — || March 17, 1993 || La Silla || UESAC || NYS || align=right | 1.4 km || 
|-id=155 bgcolor=#d6d6d6
| 79155 ||  || — || March 17, 1993 || La Silla || UESAC || HYG || align=right | 5.4 km || 
|-id=156 bgcolor=#d6d6d6
| 79156 ||  || — || March 17, 1993 || La Silla || UESAC || — || align=right | 6.8 km || 
|-id=157 bgcolor=#fefefe
| 79157 ||  || — || March 17, 1993 || La Silla || UESAC || V || align=right | 1.6 km || 
|-id=158 bgcolor=#d6d6d6
| 79158 ||  || — || March 19, 1993 || La Silla || UESAC || — || align=right | 4.9 km || 
|-id=159 bgcolor=#d6d6d6
| 79159 ||  || — || March 17, 1993 || La Silla || UESAC || HYG || align=right | 6.4 km || 
|-id=160 bgcolor=#d6d6d6
| 79160 ||  || — || March 17, 1993 || La Silla || UESAC || — || align=right | 8.8 km || 
|-id=161 bgcolor=#d6d6d6
| 79161 ||  || — || March 17, 1993 || La Silla || UESAC || HYG || align=right | 6.7 km || 
|-id=162 bgcolor=#fefefe
| 79162 ||  || — || March 19, 1993 || La Silla || UESAC || ERI || align=right | 3.6 km || 
|-id=163 bgcolor=#fefefe
| 79163 ||  || — || March 21, 1993 || La Silla || UESAC || NYS || align=right | 1.6 km || 
|-id=164 bgcolor=#fefefe
| 79164 ||  || — || March 21, 1993 || La Silla || UESAC || MAS || align=right | 1.7 km || 
|-id=165 bgcolor=#fefefe
| 79165 ||  || — || March 21, 1993 || La Silla || UESAC || — || align=right | 5.8 km || 
|-id=166 bgcolor=#d6d6d6
| 79166 ||  || — || March 21, 1993 || La Silla || UESAC || — || align=right | 6.8 km || 
|-id=167 bgcolor=#fefefe
| 79167 ||  || — || March 21, 1993 || La Silla || UESAC || — || align=right | 2.5 km || 
|-id=168 bgcolor=#E9E9E9
| 79168 ||  || — || March 19, 1993 || La Silla || UESAC || — || align=right | 2.9 km || 
|-id=169 bgcolor=#fefefe
| 79169 ||  || — || March 19, 1993 || La Silla || UESAC || V || align=right | 2.0 km || 
|-id=170 bgcolor=#d6d6d6
| 79170 ||  || — || March 19, 1993 || La Silla || UESAC || TIR || align=right | 4.0 km || 
|-id=171 bgcolor=#d6d6d6
| 79171 ||  || — || March 19, 1993 || La Silla || UESAC || — || align=right | 4.8 km || 
|-id=172 bgcolor=#fefefe
| 79172 ||  || — || March 19, 1993 || La Silla || UESAC || NYS || align=right | 3.1 km || 
|-id=173 bgcolor=#d6d6d6
| 79173 ||  || — || March 19, 1993 || La Silla || UESAC || — || align=right | 6.5 km || 
|-id=174 bgcolor=#fefefe
| 79174 ||  || — || March 19, 1993 || La Silla || UESAC || MAS || align=right | 1.9 km || 
|-id=175 bgcolor=#fefefe
| 79175 ||  || — || March 19, 1993 || La Silla || UESAC || — || align=right | 1.7 km || 
|-id=176 bgcolor=#fefefe
| 79176 ||  || — || March 19, 1993 || La Silla || UESAC || — || align=right | 3.3 km || 
|-id=177 bgcolor=#fefefe
| 79177 ||  || — || March 19, 1993 || La Silla || UESAC || NYS || align=right | 4.0 km || 
|-id=178 bgcolor=#fefefe
| 79178 ||  || — || March 17, 1993 || La Silla || UESAC || NYS || align=right | 1.3 km || 
|-id=179 bgcolor=#fefefe
| 79179 ||  || — || March 17, 1993 || La Silla || UESAC || — || align=right | 1.5 km || 
|-id=180 bgcolor=#d6d6d6
| 79180 ||  || — || March 19, 1993 || La Silla || UESAC || HYG || align=right | 5.1 km || 
|-id=181 bgcolor=#d6d6d6
| 79181 ||  || — || March 21, 1993 || La Silla || UESAC || URS || align=right | 6.9 km || 
|-id=182 bgcolor=#d6d6d6
| 79182 ||  || — || March 19, 1993 || La Silla || UESAC || — || align=right | 5.7 km || 
|-id=183 bgcolor=#fefefe
| 79183 || 1993 KY || — || May 21, 1993 || Kitt Peak || Spacewatch || NYS || align=right | 1.1 km || 
|-id=184 bgcolor=#fefefe
| 79184 ||  || — || May 21, 1993 || Kitt Peak || Spacewatch || — || align=right | 2.4 km || 
|-id=185 bgcolor=#fefefe
| 79185 ||  || — || July 20, 1993 || La Silla || E. W. Elst || — || align=right | 1.9 km || 
|-id=186 bgcolor=#E9E9E9
| 79186 || 1993 QN || — || August 20, 1993 || Palomar || E. F. Helin, J. Alu || BAR || align=right | 3.9 km || 
|-id=187 bgcolor=#E9E9E9
| 79187 ||  || — || August 20, 1993 || La Silla || E. W. Elst || — || align=right | 3.4 km || 
|-id=188 bgcolor=#fefefe
| 79188 ||  || — || August 20, 1993 || La Silla || E. W. Elst || — || align=right | 2.0 km || 
|-id=189 bgcolor=#E9E9E9
| 79189 ||  || — || September 15, 1993 || La Silla || E. W. Elst || RAF || align=right | 2.1 km || 
|-id=190 bgcolor=#d6d6d6
| 79190 ||  || — || October 12, 1993 || Kitt Peak || Spacewatch || 3:2 || align=right | 8.6 km || 
|-id=191 bgcolor=#E9E9E9
| 79191 ||  || — || October 9, 1993 || La Silla || E. W. Elst || — || align=right | 2.8 km || 
|-id=192 bgcolor=#E9E9E9
| 79192 ||  || — || October 9, 1993 || La Silla || E. W. Elst || MAR || align=right | 2.4 km || 
|-id=193 bgcolor=#E9E9E9
| 79193 ||  || — || October 9, 1993 || La Silla || E. W. Elst || JUN || align=right | 2.2 km || 
|-id=194 bgcolor=#E9E9E9
| 79194 ||  || — || October 9, 1993 || La Silla || E. W. Elst || — || align=right | 3.2 km || 
|-id=195 bgcolor=#E9E9E9
| 79195 ||  || — || October 9, 1993 || La Silla || E. W. Elst || GEF || align=right | 2.8 km || 
|-id=196 bgcolor=#E9E9E9
| 79196 ||  || — || October 9, 1993 || La Silla || E. W. Elst || WIT || align=right | 2.2 km || 
|-id=197 bgcolor=#E9E9E9
| 79197 ||  || — || October 9, 1993 || La Silla || E. W. Elst || — || align=right | 2.6 km || 
|-id=198 bgcolor=#E9E9E9
| 79198 ||  || — || October 9, 1993 || La Silla || E. W. Elst || KRM || align=right | 8.1 km || 
|-id=199 bgcolor=#E9E9E9
| 79199 ||  || — || October 9, 1993 || La Silla || E. W. Elst || — || align=right | 4.7 km || 
|-id=200 bgcolor=#E9E9E9
| 79200 ||  || — || October 20, 1993 || La Silla || E. W. Elst || — || align=right | 2.1 km || 
|}

79201–79300 

|-bgcolor=#E9E9E9
| 79201 ||  || — || October 20, 1993 || La Silla || E. W. Elst || — || align=right | 2.1 km || 
|-id=202 bgcolor=#E9E9E9
| 79202 ||  || — || October 20, 1993 || La Silla || E. W. Elst || — || align=right | 2.6 km || 
|-id=203 bgcolor=#E9E9E9
| 79203 ||  || — || October 20, 1993 || La Silla || E. W. Elst || — || align=right | 2.0 km || 
|-id=204 bgcolor=#E9E9E9
| 79204 ||  || — || October 20, 1993 || La Silla || E. W. Elst || NEM || align=right | 3.8 km || 
|-id=205 bgcolor=#E9E9E9
| 79205 ||  || — || October 20, 1993 || La Silla || E. W. Elst || MAR || align=right | 3.7 km || 
|-id=206 bgcolor=#E9E9E9
| 79206 ||  || — || November 11, 1993 || Kushiro || S. Ueda, H. Kaneda || — || align=right | 5.3 km || 
|-id=207 bgcolor=#fefefe
| 79207 ||  || — || January 8, 1994 || Kitt Peak || Spacewatch || — || align=right | 1.3 km || 
|-id=208 bgcolor=#fefefe
| 79208 ||  || — || January 11, 1994 || Kitt Peak || Spacewatch || — || align=right | 1.5 km || 
|-id=209 bgcolor=#E9E9E9
| 79209 ||  || — || January 11, 1994 || Kitt Peak || Spacewatch || HOF || align=right | 5.2 km || 
|-id=210 bgcolor=#fefefe
| 79210 ||  || — || February 8, 1994 || La Silla || E. W. Elst || FLO || align=right | 1.5 km || 
|-id=211 bgcolor=#d6d6d6
| 79211 ||  || — || February 8, 1994 || La Silla || E. W. Elst || EOS || align=right | 4.3 km || 
|-id=212 bgcolor=#fefefe
| 79212 || 1994 ET || — || March 6, 1994 || San Marcello || L. Tesi, G. Cattani || — || align=right | 1.5 km || 
|-id=213 bgcolor=#d6d6d6
| 79213 || 1994 EX || — || March 8, 1994 || Stroncone || A. Vagnozzi || KAR || align=right | 2.9 km || 
|-id=214 bgcolor=#fefefe
| 79214 ||  || — || April 11, 1994 || Kitt Peak || Spacewatch || fast? || align=right | 1.2 km || 
|-id=215 bgcolor=#d6d6d6
| 79215 || 1994 HU || — || April 16, 1994 || Kitt Peak || Spacewatch || — || align=right | 4.3 km || 
|-id=216 bgcolor=#d6d6d6
| 79216 ||  || — || May 3, 1994 || Kitt Peak || Spacewatch || — || align=right | 8.2 km || 
|-id=217 bgcolor=#fefefe
| 79217 ||  || — || May 3, 1994 || Kitt Peak || Spacewatch || — || align=right | 2.1 km || 
|-id=218 bgcolor=#d6d6d6
| 79218 ||  || — || May 8, 1994 || Kitt Peak || Spacewatch || — || align=right | 5.3 km || 
|-id=219 bgcolor=#FA8072
| 79219 || 1994 LN || — || June 5, 1994 || Kitt Peak || Spacewatch || H || align=right | 2.1 km || 
|-id=220 bgcolor=#d6d6d6
| 79220 ||  || — || August 12, 1994 || Siding Spring || R. H. McNaught || Tj (2.99) || align=right | 8.5 km || 
|-id=221 bgcolor=#fefefe
| 79221 ||  || — || August 10, 1994 || La Silla || E. W. Elst || — || align=right | 2.1 km || 
|-id=222 bgcolor=#fefefe
| 79222 ||  || — || August 10, 1994 || La Silla || E. W. Elst || MAS || align=right | 1.6 km || 
|-id=223 bgcolor=#fefefe
| 79223 ||  || — || August 10, 1994 || La Silla || E. W. Elst || — || align=right | 2.0 km || 
|-id=224 bgcolor=#fefefe
| 79224 ||  || — || August 10, 1994 || La Silla || E. W. Elst || NYS || align=right | 1.4 km || 
|-id=225 bgcolor=#fefefe
| 79225 ||  || — || August 10, 1994 || La Silla || E. W. Elst || V || align=right | 1.4 km || 
|-id=226 bgcolor=#fefefe
| 79226 ||  || — || August 10, 1994 || La Silla || E. W. Elst || — || align=right | 1.5 km || 
|-id=227 bgcolor=#E9E9E9
| 79227 ||  || — || August 10, 1994 || La Silla || E. W. Elst || — || align=right | 3.7 km || 
|-id=228 bgcolor=#fefefe
| 79228 ||  || — || August 10, 1994 || La Silla || E. W. Elst || NYS || align=right | 1.6 km || 
|-id=229 bgcolor=#fefefe
| 79229 ||  || — || August 12, 1994 || La Silla || E. W. Elst || NYS || align=right | 1.4 km || 
|-id=230 bgcolor=#fefefe
| 79230 ||  || — || August 12, 1994 || La Silla || E. W. Elst || — || align=right | 2.2 km || 
|-id=231 bgcolor=#fefefe
| 79231 ||  || — || August 12, 1994 || La Silla || E. W. Elst || — || align=right | 2.5 km || 
|-id=232 bgcolor=#fefefe
| 79232 ||  || — || August 12, 1994 || La Silla || E. W. Elst || V || align=right | 1.5 km || 
|-id=233 bgcolor=#fefefe
| 79233 ||  || — || August 12, 1994 || La Silla || E. W. Elst || NYS || align=right | 4.1 km || 
|-id=234 bgcolor=#fefefe
| 79234 ||  || — || August 12, 1994 || La Silla || E. W. Elst || FLO || align=right | 1.5 km || 
|-id=235 bgcolor=#fefefe
| 79235 ||  || — || August 12, 1994 || La Silla || E. W. Elst || — || align=right | 1.8 km || 
|-id=236 bgcolor=#fefefe
| 79236 ||  || — || August 12, 1994 || La Silla || E. W. Elst || V || align=right | 1.6 km || 
|-id=237 bgcolor=#fefefe
| 79237 ||  || — || August 12, 1994 || La Silla || E. W. Elst || — || align=right | 1.4 km || 
|-id=238 bgcolor=#fefefe
| 79238 ||  || — || August 10, 1994 || La Silla || E. W. Elst || MAS || align=right | 1.9 km || 
|-id=239 bgcolor=#fefefe
| 79239 ||  || — || August 10, 1994 || La Silla || E. W. Elst || NYS || align=right | 1.3 km || 
|-id=240 bgcolor=#fefefe
| 79240 Rosanna || 1994 QD ||  || August 26, 1994 || Farra d'Isonzo || Farra d'Isonzo || NYS || align=right | 1.7 km || 
|-id=241 bgcolor=#fefefe
| 79241 Fulviobressan || 1994 QE ||  || August 26, 1994 || Farra d'Isonzo || Farra d'Isonzo || — || align=right | 1.6 km || 
|-id=242 bgcolor=#d6d6d6
| 79242 || 1994 RE || — || September 3, 1994 || Stroncone || Santa Lucia Obs. || URS || align=right | 8.5 km || 
|-id=243 bgcolor=#fefefe
| 79243 ||  || — || September 9, 1994 || Kleť || Kleť Obs. || NYS || align=right | 1.5 km || 
|-id=244 bgcolor=#E9E9E9
| 79244 ||  || — || September 1, 1994 || Palomar || E. F. Helin || — || align=right | 4.2 km || 
|-id=245 bgcolor=#fefefe
| 79245 ||  || — || September 5, 1994 || La Silla || E. W. Elst || — || align=right | 1.8 km || 
|-id=246 bgcolor=#E9E9E9
| 79246 ||  || — || September 28, 1994 || Kitt Peak || Spacewatch || — || align=right | 1.7 km || 
|-id=247 bgcolor=#fefefe
| 79247 ||  || — || September 28, 1994 || Kitt Peak || Spacewatch || V || align=right | 2.2 km || 
|-id=248 bgcolor=#fefefe
| 79248 || 1994 TJ || — || October 6, 1994 || Farra d'Isonzo || Farra d'Isonzo || — || align=right | 7.0 km || 
|-id=249 bgcolor=#fefefe
| 79249 || 1994 TL || — || October 2, 1994 || Kitami || K. Endate, K. Watanabe || NYS || align=right | 2.1 km || 
|-id=250 bgcolor=#fefefe
| 79250 ||  || — || October 2, 1994 || Kitt Peak || Spacewatch || — || align=right | 1.5 km || 
|-id=251 bgcolor=#fefefe
| 79251 ||  || — || October 8, 1994 || Kitt Peak || Spacewatch || — || align=right | 1.7 km || 
|-id=252 bgcolor=#fefefe
| 79252 ||  || — || October 10, 1994 || Kitt Peak || Spacewatch || NYS || align=right | 2.1 km || 
|-id=253 bgcolor=#E9E9E9
| 79253 ||  || — || October 28, 1994 || Kitt Peak || Spacewatch || — || align=right | 3.4 km || 
|-id=254 bgcolor=#fefefe
| 79254 Tsuda || 1994 YJ ||  || December 23, 1994 || Kuma Kogen || A. Nakamura || — || align=right | 2.5 km || 
|-id=255 bgcolor=#E9E9E9
| 79255 ||  || — || December 31, 1994 || Kitt Peak || Spacewatch || — || align=right | 4.1 km || 
|-id=256 bgcolor=#E9E9E9
| 79256 ||  || — || January 29, 1995 || Kitt Peak || Spacewatch || — || align=right | 3.1 km || 
|-id=257 bgcolor=#E9E9E9
| 79257 ||  || — || February 1, 1995 || Kitt Peak || Spacewatch || — || align=right | 2.8 km || 
|-id=258 bgcolor=#E9E9E9
| 79258 ||  || — || February 22, 1995 || Oizumi || T. Kobayashi || — || align=right | 5.1 km || 
|-id=259 bgcolor=#E9E9E9
| 79259 ||  || — || February 25, 1995 || Kitt Peak || Spacewatch || PAD || align=right | 4.4 km || 
|-id=260 bgcolor=#E9E9E9
| 79260 ||  || — || March 2, 1995 || Kitt Peak || Spacewatch || ADE || align=right | 5.3 km || 
|-id=261 bgcolor=#E9E9E9
| 79261 ||  || — || March 27, 1995 || Kitt Peak || Spacewatch || — || align=right | 4.4 km || 
|-id=262 bgcolor=#E9E9E9
| 79262 ||  || — || March 31, 1995 || Kitt Peak || Spacewatch || — || align=right | 3.9 km || 
|-id=263 bgcolor=#E9E9E9
| 79263 ||  || — || April 29, 1995 || Kitt Peak || Spacewatch || — || align=right | 5.0 km || 
|-id=264 bgcolor=#d6d6d6
| 79264 ||  || — || June 29, 1995 || Kitt Peak || Spacewatch || — || align=right | 8.2 km || 
|-id=265 bgcolor=#d6d6d6
| 79265 ||  || — || July 22, 1995 || Kitt Peak || Spacewatch || EOS || align=right | 4.7 km || 
|-id=266 bgcolor=#fefefe
| 79266 ||  || — || July 22, 1995 || Kitt Peak || Spacewatch || — || align=right | 1.5 km || 
|-id=267 bgcolor=#fefefe
| 79267 ||  || — || July 22, 1995 || Kitt Peak || Spacewatch || — || align=right | 1.3 km || 
|-id=268 bgcolor=#d6d6d6
| 79268 ||  || — || July 23, 1995 || Kitt Peak || Spacewatch || EOS || align=right | 3.4 km || 
|-id=269 bgcolor=#d6d6d6
| 79269 ||  || — || August 19, 1995 || Xinglong || SCAP || — || align=right | 5.4 km || 
|-id=270 bgcolor=#d6d6d6
| 79270 ||  || — || August 27, 1995 || Kitt Peak || Spacewatch || EOS || align=right | 4.5 km || 
|-id=271 bgcolor=#fefefe
| 79271 Bellagio ||  ||  || September 28, 1995 || Sormano || V. Giuliani, G. Ventre || FLO || align=right | 1.4 km || 
|-id=272 bgcolor=#fefefe
| 79272 ||  || — || September 17, 1995 || Kitt Peak || Spacewatch || — || align=right | 3.5 km || 
|-id=273 bgcolor=#fefefe
| 79273 ||  || — || September 18, 1995 || Kitt Peak || Spacewatch || FLO || align=right data-sort-value="0.97" | 970 m || 
|-id=274 bgcolor=#d6d6d6
| 79274 ||  || — || September 18, 1995 || Kitt Peak || Spacewatch || VER || align=right | 5.1 km || 
|-id=275 bgcolor=#d6d6d6
| 79275 ||  || — || September 19, 1995 || Kitt Peak || Spacewatch || EOS || align=right | 8.3 km || 
|-id=276 bgcolor=#fefefe
| 79276 ||  || — || September 19, 1995 || Kitt Peak || Spacewatch || NYS || align=right | 1.1 km || 
|-id=277 bgcolor=#fefefe
| 79277 ||  || — || September 19, 1995 || Kitt Peak || Spacewatch || — || align=right | 1.9 km || 
|-id=278 bgcolor=#d6d6d6
| 79278 ||  || — || September 20, 1995 || Kitt Peak || Spacewatch || — || align=right | 3.0 km || 
|-id=279 bgcolor=#d6d6d6
| 79279 ||  || — || September 20, 1995 || Kitt Peak || Spacewatch || URS || align=right | 9.4 km || 
|-id=280 bgcolor=#d6d6d6
| 79280 ||  || — || September 21, 1995 || Kitt Peak || Spacewatch || — || align=right | 6.5 km || 
|-id=281 bgcolor=#fefefe
| 79281 ||  || — || September 21, 1995 || Kitt Peak || Spacewatch || — || align=right | 1.4 km || 
|-id=282 bgcolor=#d6d6d6
| 79282 ||  || — || September 21, 1995 || Kitt Peak || Spacewatch || — || align=right | 7.6 km || 
|-id=283 bgcolor=#fefefe
| 79283 ||  || — || September 25, 1995 || Kitt Peak || Spacewatch || NYS || align=right | 1.3 km || 
|-id=284 bgcolor=#fefefe
| 79284 ||  || — || September 25, 1995 || Kitt Peak || Spacewatch || — || align=right | 1.6 km || 
|-id=285 bgcolor=#fefefe
| 79285 ||  || — || September 28, 1995 || Xinglong || SCAP || — || align=right | 1.6 km || 
|-id=286 bgcolor=#fefefe
| 79286 Hexiantu ||  ||  || September 28, 1995 || Xinglong || SCAP || — || align=right | 2.4 km || 
|-id=287 bgcolor=#d6d6d6
| 79287 ||  || — || September 23, 1995 || Kitt Peak || Spacewatch || HYG || align=right | 4.9 km || 
|-id=288 bgcolor=#d6d6d6
| 79288 ||  || — || September 19, 1995 || Kitt Peak || Spacewatch || — || align=right | 5.0 km || 
|-id=289 bgcolor=#fefefe
| 79289 ||  || — || October 15, 1995 || Kitt Peak || Spacewatch || — || align=right | 1.6 km || 
|-id=290 bgcolor=#fefefe
| 79290 ||  || — || October 15, 1995 || Kitt Peak || Spacewatch || — || align=right | 1.8 km || 
|-id=291 bgcolor=#E9E9E9
| 79291 ||  || — || October 27, 1995 || Oizumi || T. Kobayashi || — || align=right | 3.2 km || 
|-id=292 bgcolor=#fefefe
| 79292 ||  || — || October 17, 1995 || Kitt Peak || Spacewatch || — || align=right | 1.6 km || 
|-id=293 bgcolor=#d6d6d6
| 79293 ||  || — || October 20, 1995 || Kitt Peak || Spacewatch || THM || align=right | 5.4 km || 
|-id=294 bgcolor=#d6d6d6
| 79294 ||  || — || October 24, 1995 || Kitt Peak || Spacewatch || — || align=right | 4.6 km || 
|-id=295 bgcolor=#fefefe
| 79295 ||  || — || October 24, 1995 || Kitt Peak || Spacewatch || MAS || align=right | 1.5 km || 
|-id=296 bgcolor=#fefefe
| 79296 ||  || — || November 14, 1995 || Kitt Peak || Spacewatch || — || align=right | 2.3 km || 
|-id=297 bgcolor=#fefefe
| 79297 ||  || — || November 14, 1995 || Kitt Peak || Spacewatch || NYS || align=right | 1.0 km || 
|-id=298 bgcolor=#fefefe
| 79298 ||  || — || November 15, 1995 || Kitt Peak || Spacewatch || NYS || align=right | 1.3 km || 
|-id=299 bgcolor=#fefefe
| 79299 ||  || — || November 16, 1995 || Kushiro || S. Ueda, H. Kaneda || FLO || align=right | 2.5 km || 
|-id=300 bgcolor=#fefefe
| 79300 ||  || — || November 16, 1995 || Kitt Peak || Spacewatch || FLO || align=right | 1.3 km || 
|}

79301–79400 

|-bgcolor=#d6d6d6
| 79301 ||  || — || November 17, 1995 || Kitt Peak || Spacewatch || — || align=right | 5.2 km || 
|-id=302 bgcolor=#fefefe
| 79302 ||  || — || November 18, 1995 || Kitt Peak || Spacewatch || — || align=right | 1.9 km || 
|-id=303 bgcolor=#fefefe
| 79303 ||  || — || November 20, 1995 || Kitt Peak || Spacewatch || — || align=right | 1.9 km || 
|-id=304 bgcolor=#fefefe
| 79304 ||  || — || November 21, 1995 || Kitt Peak || Spacewatch || FLO || align=right | 2.7 km || 
|-id=305 bgcolor=#fefefe
| 79305 || 1995 XK || — || December 12, 1995 || Sudbury || D. di Cicco || FLO || align=right | 1.9 km || 
|-id=306 bgcolor=#fefefe
| 79306 ||  || — || December 18, 1995 || Kitt Peak || Spacewatch || V || align=right | 1.7 km || 
|-id=307 bgcolor=#E9E9E9
| 79307 ||  || — || December 18, 1995 || Kitt Peak || Spacewatch || — || align=right | 2.1 km || 
|-id=308 bgcolor=#fefefe
| 79308 ||  || — || December 18, 1995 || Kitt Peak || Spacewatch || CLA || align=right | 3.1 km || 
|-id=309 bgcolor=#fefefe
| 79309 ||  || — || December 19, 1995 || Haleakala || NEAT || — || align=right | 1.5 km || 
|-id=310 bgcolor=#fefefe
| 79310 ||  || — || January 12, 1996 || Kitt Peak || Spacewatch || NYS || align=right | 1.1 km || 
|-id=311 bgcolor=#fefefe
| 79311 ||  || — || January 15, 1996 || Kitt Peak || Spacewatch || V || align=right | 1.7 km || 
|-id=312 bgcolor=#fefefe
| 79312 ||  || — || January 18, 1996 || Kitt Peak || Spacewatch || NYS || align=right | 1.3 km || 
|-id=313 bgcolor=#fefefe
| 79313 || 1996 CK || — || February 1, 1996 || Xinglong || SCAP || H || align=right | 1.3 km || 
|-id=314 bgcolor=#fefefe
| 79314 ||  || — || February 23, 1996 || Stroncone || A. Vagnozzi || — || align=right | 2.1 km || 
|-id=315 bgcolor=#E9E9E9
| 79315 ||  || — || March 11, 1996 || Kitt Peak || Spacewatch || — || align=right | 1.1 km || 
|-id=316 bgcolor=#fefefe
| 79316 Huangshan ||  ||  || April 18, 1996 || Xinglong || SCAP || Hslow || align=right | 2.3 km || 
|-id=317 bgcolor=#E9E9E9
| 79317 ||  || — || April 18, 1996 || La Silla || E. W. Elst || — || align=right | 2.7 km || 
|-id=318 bgcolor=#E9E9E9
| 79318 ||  || — || April 20, 1996 || La Silla || E. W. Elst || — || align=right | 2.0 km || 
|-id=319 bgcolor=#E9E9E9
| 79319 ||  || — || April 20, 1996 || La Silla || E. W. Elst || — || align=right | 2.2 km || 
|-id=320 bgcolor=#E9E9E9
| 79320 ||  || — || April 20, 1996 || La Silla || E. W. Elst || — || align=right | 3.2 km || 
|-id=321 bgcolor=#E9E9E9
| 79321 ||  || — || May 10, 1996 || Kitt Peak || Spacewatch || EUN || align=right | 2.5 km || 
|-id=322 bgcolor=#E9E9E9
| 79322 ||  || — || May 10, 1996 || Kitt Peak || Spacewatch || — || align=right | 3.0 km || 
|-id=323 bgcolor=#E9E9E9
| 79323 ||  || — || August 8, 1996 || La Silla || E. W. Elst || — || align=right | 6.5 km || 
|-id=324 bgcolor=#E9E9E9
| 79324 ||  || — || August 8, 1996 || La Silla || E. W. Elst || — || align=right | 3.4 km || 
|-id=325 bgcolor=#d6d6d6
| 79325 || 1996 QJ || — || August 17, 1996 || Haleakala || NEAT || — || align=right | 4.8 km || 
|-id=326 bgcolor=#E9E9E9
| 79326 ||  || — || August 18, 1996 || Caussols || E. W. Elst || GEF || align=right | 3.0 km || 
|-id=327 bgcolor=#d6d6d6
| 79327 ||  || — || September 8, 1996 || Kitt Peak || Spacewatch || KOR || align=right | 3.0 km || 
|-id=328 bgcolor=#d6d6d6
| 79328 ||  || — || September 15, 1996 || Kitt Peak || Spacewatch || KOR || align=right | 2.9 km || 
|-id=329 bgcolor=#d6d6d6
| 79329 ||  || — || September 13, 1996 || Kitt Peak || Spacewatch || — || align=right | 3.6 km || 
|-id=330 bgcolor=#E9E9E9
| 79330 ||  || — || September 8, 1996 || Kitt Peak || Spacewatch || — || align=right | 2.2 km || 
|-id=331 bgcolor=#d6d6d6
| 79331 || 1996 TY || — || October 5, 1996 || Sudbury || D. di Cicco || — || align=right | 5.1 km || 
|-id=332 bgcolor=#d6d6d6
| 79332 ||  || — || October 3, 1996 || Xinglong || SCAP || THM || align=right | 5.1 km || 
|-id=333 bgcolor=#E9E9E9
| 79333 Yusaku ||  ||  || October 5, 1996 || Kuma Kogen || A. Nakamura || — || align=right | 2.2 km || 
|-id=334 bgcolor=#d6d6d6
| 79334 ||  || — || October 15, 1996 || Sudbury || D. di Cicco || TEL || align=right | 3.1 km || 
|-id=335 bgcolor=#d6d6d6
| 79335 ||  || — || October 4, 1996 || Kitt Peak || Spacewatch || — || align=right | 3.9 km || 
|-id=336 bgcolor=#d6d6d6
| 79336 ||  || — || October 5, 1996 || Kitt Peak || Spacewatch || — || align=right | 7.4 km || 
|-id=337 bgcolor=#d6d6d6
| 79337 ||  || — || October 5, 1996 || Kitt Peak || Spacewatch || KOR || align=right | 4.4 km || 
|-id=338 bgcolor=#d6d6d6
| 79338 ||  || — || October 6, 1996 || Kitt Peak || Spacewatch || — || align=right | 4.6 km || 
|-id=339 bgcolor=#fefefe
| 79339 ||  || — || October 8, 1996 || La Silla || E. W. Elst || — || align=right | 1.5 km || 
|-id=340 bgcolor=#E9E9E9
| 79340 ||  || — || October 8, 1996 || La Silla || E. W. Elst || — || align=right | 3.1 km || 
|-id=341 bgcolor=#d6d6d6
| 79341 ||  || — || October 30, 1996 || Prescott || P. G. Comba || — || align=right | 7.0 km || 
|-id=342 bgcolor=#d6d6d6
| 79342 ||  || — || November 5, 1996 || Kitt Peak || Spacewatch || — || align=right | 7.2 km || 
|-id=343 bgcolor=#d6d6d6
| 79343 ||  || — || November 6, 1996 || Kitt Peak || Spacewatch || — || align=right | 4.1 km || 
|-id=344 bgcolor=#d6d6d6
| 79344 ||  || — || November 11, 1996 || Kitt Peak || Spacewatch || — || align=right | 4.4 km || 
|-id=345 bgcolor=#d6d6d6
| 79345 ||  || — || November 5, 1996 || Kitt Peak || Spacewatch || EOS || align=right | 4.5 km || 
|-id=346 bgcolor=#d6d6d6
| 79346 ||  || — || November 6, 1996 || Kitt Peak || Spacewatch || — || align=right | 5.6 km || 
|-id=347 bgcolor=#d6d6d6
| 79347 Medlov ||  ||  || December 4, 1996 || Kleť || J. Tichá, M. Tichý || LUT || align=right | 6.8 km || 
|-id=348 bgcolor=#d6d6d6
| 79348 ||  || — || December 1, 1996 || Kitt Peak || Spacewatch || — || align=right | 5.3 km || 
|-id=349 bgcolor=#d6d6d6
| 79349 ||  || — || December 8, 1996 || Kitt Peak || Spacewatch || URS || align=right | 6.9 km || 
|-id=350 bgcolor=#fefefe
| 79350 || 1996 YW || — || December 20, 1996 || Oizumi || T. Kobayashi || — || align=right | 2.3 km || 
|-id=351 bgcolor=#fefefe
| 79351 ||  || — || January 1, 1997 || Xinglong || SCAP || — || align=right | 2.4 km || 
|-id=352 bgcolor=#fefefe
| 79352 ||  || — || January 3, 1997 || Uenohara || N. Kawasato || — || align=right | 1.3 km || 
|-id=353 bgcolor=#fefefe
| 79353 Andrewalday ||  ||  || January 13, 1997 || Haleakala || NEAT || V || align=right | 1.4 km || 
|-id=354 bgcolor=#fefefe
| 79354 Brundibár || 1997 BB ||  || January 16, 1997 || Kleť || M. Tichý, J. Tichá || — || align=right | 1.4 km || 
|-id=355 bgcolor=#fefefe
| 79355 ||  || — || January 31, 1997 || Kitt Peak || Spacewatch || FLO || align=right | 1.6 km || 
|-id=356 bgcolor=#fefefe
| 79356 ||  || — || January 31, 1997 || Kitt Peak || Spacewatch || — || align=right | 1.7 km || 
|-id=357 bgcolor=#fefefe
| 79357 ||  || — || February 4, 1997 || Prescott || P. G. Comba || — || align=right | 1.5 km || 
|-id=358 bgcolor=#fefefe
| 79358 ||  || — || February 3, 1997 || Haleakala || NEAT || — || align=right | 1.7 km || 
|-id=359 bgcolor=#d6d6d6
| 79359 ||  || — || February 3, 1997 || Kitt Peak || Spacewatch || — || align=right | 6.2 km || 
|-id=360 bgcolor=#C2E0FF
| 79360 Sila-Nunam ||  ||  || February 3, 1997 || Mauna Kea || J. X. Luu, D. C. Jewitt, C. Trujillo, J. Chen || cubewano (cold)moonslow || align=right | 388 km || 
|-id=361 bgcolor=#fefefe
| 79361 || 1997 DA || — || February 16, 1997 || Modra || P. Kolény, L. Kornoš || — || align=right | 2.4 km || 
|-id=362 bgcolor=#fefefe
| 79362 ||  || — || March 4, 1997 || Oizumi || T. Kobayashi || FLO || align=right | 2.2 km || 
|-id=363 bgcolor=#fefefe
| 79363 ||  || — || March 2, 1997 || Kitt Peak || Spacewatch || V || align=right | 1.2 km || 
|-id=364 bgcolor=#fefefe
| 79364 ||  || — || March 2, 1997 || Kitt Peak || Spacewatch || NYS || align=right | 1.0 km || 
|-id=365 bgcolor=#fefefe
| 79365 ||  || — || March 3, 1997 || Kitt Peak || Spacewatch || — || align=right | 2.1 km || 
|-id=366 bgcolor=#fefefe
| 79366 ||  || — || March 3, 1997 || Kitt Peak || Spacewatch || NYS || align=right | 1.1 km || 
|-id=367 bgcolor=#fefefe
| 79367 ||  || — || March 3, 1997 || Kitt Peak || Spacewatch || NYS || align=right data-sort-value="0.82" | 820 m || 
|-id=368 bgcolor=#fefefe
| 79368 ||  || — || March 5, 1997 || Kitt Peak || Spacewatch || — || align=right | 1.4 km || 
|-id=369 bgcolor=#fefefe
| 79369 ||  || — || March 5, 1997 || Kitt Peak || Spacewatch || — || align=right | 2.3 km || 
|-id=370 bgcolor=#fefefe
| 79370 ||  || — || March 4, 1997 || Socorro || LINEAR || — || align=right | 3.9 km || 
|-id=371 bgcolor=#fefefe
| 79371 ||  || — || March 5, 1997 || Socorro || LINEAR || — || align=right | 1.7 km || 
|-id=372 bgcolor=#fefefe
| 79372 ||  || — || March 10, 1997 || Socorro || LINEAR || — || align=right | 1.8 km || 
|-id=373 bgcolor=#fefefe
| 79373 ||  || — || March 10, 1997 || Socorro || LINEAR || NYS || align=right | 1.2 km || 
|-id=374 bgcolor=#fefefe
| 79374 ||  || — || March 11, 1997 || La Silla || E. W. Elst || — || align=right | 2.2 km || 
|-id=375 bgcolor=#fefefe
| 79375 Valetti || 1997 FA ||  || March 16, 1997 || Pianoro || V. Goretti || — || align=right | 2.0 km || 
|-id=376 bgcolor=#fefefe
| 79376 || 1997 FF || — || March 18, 1997 || Xinglong || SCAP || PHO || align=right | 2.6 km || 
|-id=377 bgcolor=#fefefe
| 79377 || 1997 FV || — || March 18, 1997 || Xinglong || SCAP || — || align=right | 4.0 km || 
|-id=378 bgcolor=#fefefe
| 79378 ||  || — || March 29, 1997 || Xinglong || SCAP || NYS || align=right | 1.8 km || 
|-id=379 bgcolor=#fefefe
| 79379 ||  || — || March 31, 1997 || Socorro || LINEAR || V || align=right | 1.3 km || 
|-id=380 bgcolor=#fefefe
| 79380 || 1997 GN || — || April 4, 1997 || Haleakala || NEAT || PHO || align=right | 2.6 km || 
|-id=381 bgcolor=#fefefe
| 79381 ||  || — || April 7, 1997 || Kitt Peak || Spacewatch || V || align=right | 1.1 km || 
|-id=382 bgcolor=#fefefe
| 79382 ||  || — || April 8, 1997 || Sormano || M. Cavagna, P. Chiavenna || — || align=right | 1.6 km || 
|-id=383 bgcolor=#fefefe
| 79383 ||  || — || April 2, 1997 || Socorro || LINEAR || NYS || align=right | 1.4 km || 
|-id=384 bgcolor=#fefefe
| 79384 ||  || — || April 2, 1997 || Socorro || LINEAR || — || align=right | 1.5 km || 
|-id=385 bgcolor=#fefefe
| 79385 ||  || — || April 2, 1997 || Socorro || LINEAR || — || align=right | 2.0 km || 
|-id=386 bgcolor=#fefefe
| 79386 ||  || — || April 3, 1997 || Socorro || LINEAR || V || align=right | 1.4 km || 
|-id=387 bgcolor=#fefefe
| 79387 ||  || — || April 3, 1997 || Socorro || LINEAR || V || align=right | 1.4 km || 
|-id=388 bgcolor=#fefefe
| 79388 ||  || — || April 3, 1997 || Socorro || LINEAR || V || align=right | 1.1 km || 
|-id=389 bgcolor=#fefefe
| 79389 ||  || — || April 3, 1997 || Socorro || LINEAR || — || align=right | 1.7 km || 
|-id=390 bgcolor=#fefefe
| 79390 ||  || — || April 3, 1997 || Socorro || LINEAR || — || align=right | 2.9 km || 
|-id=391 bgcolor=#fefefe
| 79391 ||  || — || April 3, 1997 || Socorro || LINEAR || NYS || align=right | 1.5 km || 
|-id=392 bgcolor=#fefefe
| 79392 ||  || — || April 3, 1997 || Socorro || LINEAR || — || align=right | 1.8 km || 
|-id=393 bgcolor=#fefefe
| 79393 ||  || — || April 3, 1997 || Socorro || LINEAR || — || align=right | 1.6 km || 
|-id=394 bgcolor=#fefefe
| 79394 ||  || — || April 3, 1997 || Socorro || LINEAR || V || align=right | 1.4 km || 
|-id=395 bgcolor=#fefefe
| 79395 ||  || — || April 6, 1997 || Socorro || LINEAR || — || align=right | 2.0 km || 
|-id=396 bgcolor=#fefefe
| 79396 ||  || — || April 6, 1997 || Socorro || LINEAR || NYS || align=right | 1.3 km || 
|-id=397 bgcolor=#fefefe
| 79397 ||  || — || April 6, 1997 || Socorro || LINEAR || — || align=right | 1.9 km || 
|-id=398 bgcolor=#fefefe
| 79398 ||  || — || April 9, 1997 || Kitt Peak || Spacewatch || V || align=right | 1.5 km || 
|-id=399 bgcolor=#fefefe
| 79399 ||  || — || April 13, 1997 || Xinglong || SCAP || — || align=right | 1.6 km || 
|-id=400 bgcolor=#fefefe
| 79400 ||  || — || April 30, 1997 || Kitt Peak || Spacewatch || — || align=right | 2.4 km || 
|}

79401–79500 

|-bgcolor=#fefefe
| 79401 ||  || — || April 25, 1997 || Majorca || Á. López J., R. Pacheco || — || align=right | 2.0 km || 
|-id=402 bgcolor=#fefefe
| 79402 ||  || — || April 28, 1997 || Kitt Peak || Spacewatch || FLO || align=right | 1.4 km || 
|-id=403 bgcolor=#fefefe
| 79403 ||  || — || April 30, 1997 || Socorro || LINEAR || — || align=right | 2.2 km || 
|-id=404 bgcolor=#fefefe
| 79404 ||  || — || April 30, 1997 || Socorro || LINEAR || — || align=right | 2.5 km || 
|-id=405 bgcolor=#fefefe
| 79405 ||  || — || April 30, 1997 || Socorro || LINEAR || — || align=right | 1.6 km || 
|-id=406 bgcolor=#fefefe
| 79406 ||  || — || April 28, 1997 || Kitt Peak || Spacewatch || MAS || align=right | 1.1 km || 
|-id=407 bgcolor=#fefefe
| 79407 ||  || — || May 1, 1997 || Socorro || LINEAR || NYS || align=right | 1.4 km || 
|-id=408 bgcolor=#fefefe
| 79408 ||  || — || May 8, 1997 || Prescott || P. G. Comba || NYS || align=right | 1.4 km || 
|-id=409 bgcolor=#fefefe
| 79409 ||  || — || May 3, 1997 || La Silla || E. W. Elst || ERI || align=right | 3.9 km || 
|-id=410 bgcolor=#fefefe
| 79410 Wallerius ||  ||  || May 3, 1997 || La Silla || E. W. Elst || — || align=right | 2.7 km || 
|-id=411 bgcolor=#fefefe
| 79411 ||  || — || May 3, 1997 || La Silla || E. W. Elst || — || align=right | 1.7 km || 
|-id=412 bgcolor=#fefefe
| 79412 ||  || — || May 3, 1997 || La Silla || E. W. Elst || NYS || align=right | 1.9 km || 
|-id=413 bgcolor=#fefefe
| 79413 ||  || — || May 3, 1997 || La Silla || E. W. Elst || — || align=right | 1.5 km || 
|-id=414 bgcolor=#fefefe
| 79414 ||  || — || May 3, 1997 || La Silla || E. W. Elst || NYS || align=right | 1.5 km || 
|-id=415 bgcolor=#fefefe
| 79415 ||  || — || May 3, 1997 || La Silla || E. W. Elst || NYS || align=right | 1.5 km || 
|-id=416 bgcolor=#fefefe
| 79416 ||  || — || May 3, 1997 || La Silla || E. W. Elst || NYS || align=right | 1.6 km || 
|-id=417 bgcolor=#fefefe
| 79417 ||  || — || May 27, 1997 || Caussols || ODAS || V || align=right | 1.5 km || 
|-id=418 bgcolor=#fefefe
| 79418 Zhangjiajie || 1997 LO ||  || June 3, 1997 || Xinglong || SCAP || — || align=right | 2.5 km || 
|-id=419 bgcolor=#E9E9E9
| 79419 Gaolu || 1997 MZ ||  || June 26, 1997 || Xinglong || SCAP || — || align=right | 3.0 km || 
|-id=420 bgcolor=#fefefe
| 79420 ||  || — || June 28, 1997 || Socorro || LINEAR || — || align=right | 2.0 km || 
|-id=421 bgcolor=#E9E9E9
| 79421 ||  || — || June 29, 1997 || Socorro || LINEAR || — || align=right | 4.0 km || 
|-id=422 bgcolor=#E9E9E9
| 79422 ||  || — || June 26, 1997 || Kitt Peak || Spacewatch || — || align=right | 2.1 km || 
|-id=423 bgcolor=#E9E9E9
| 79423 ||  || — || June 30, 1997 || Kitt Peak || Spacewatch || — || align=right | 1.7 km || 
|-id=424 bgcolor=#E9E9E9
| 79424 ||  || — || July 6, 1997 || Kitt Peak || Spacewatch || — || align=right | 5.9 km || 
|-id=425 bgcolor=#E9E9E9
| 79425 ||  || — || July 25, 1997 || Majorca || R. Pacheco, Á. López J. || — || align=right | 2.1 km || 
|-id=426 bgcolor=#fefefe
| 79426 || 1997 QZ || — || August 24, 1997 || Bédoin || P. Antonini || — || align=right | 2.4 km || 
|-id=427 bgcolor=#E9E9E9
| 79427 ||  || — || September 24, 1997 || Farra d'Isonzo || Farra d'Isonzo || — || align=right | 2.4 km || 
|-id=428 bgcolor=#E9E9E9
| 79428 ||  || — || September 26, 1997 || Xinglong || SCAP || — || align=right | 2.6 km || 
|-id=429 bgcolor=#E9E9E9
| 79429 ||  || — || September 26, 1997 || Xinglong || SCAP || — || align=right | 2.2 km || 
|-id=430 bgcolor=#E9E9E9
| 79430 ||  || — || September 27, 1997 || Kitt Peak || Spacewatch || — || align=right | 2.1 km || 
|-id=431 bgcolor=#E9E9E9
| 79431 ||  || — || September 28, 1997 || Kitt Peak || Spacewatch || EUN || align=right | 2.2 km || 
|-id=432 bgcolor=#E9E9E9
| 79432 ||  || — || September 28, 1997 || Kitt Peak || Spacewatch || — || align=right | 2.7 km || 
|-id=433 bgcolor=#E9E9E9
| 79433 ||  || — || September 29, 1997 || Kitt Peak || Spacewatch || PAD || align=right | 4.5 km || 
|-id=434 bgcolor=#E9E9E9
| 79434 ||  || — || September 27, 1997 || Kitt Peak || Spacewatch || — || align=right | 1.9 km || 
|-id=435 bgcolor=#E9E9E9
| 79435 ||  || — || October 3, 1997 || Caussols || ODAS || — || align=right | 5.1 km || 
|-id=436 bgcolor=#E9E9E9
| 79436 ||  || — || October 2, 1997 || Caussols || ODAS || — || align=right | 6.5 km || 
|-id=437 bgcolor=#E9E9E9
| 79437 ||  || — || October 3, 1997 || Kitt Peak || Spacewatch || — || align=right | 2.2 km || 
|-id=438 bgcolor=#E9E9E9
| 79438 ||  || — || October 7, 1997 || Kitt Peak || Spacewatch || — || align=right | 1.6 km || 
|-id=439 bgcolor=#d6d6d6
| 79439 ||  || — || October 8, 1997 || Kitt Peak || Spacewatch || SHU3:2 || align=right | 9.7 km || 
|-id=440 bgcolor=#E9E9E9
| 79440 ||  || — || October 8, 1997 || Xinglong || SCAP || — || align=right | 5.7 km || 
|-id=441 bgcolor=#E9E9E9
| 79441 ||  || — || October 9, 1997 || Xinglong || SCAP || — || align=right | 2.0 km || 
|-id=442 bgcolor=#E9E9E9
| 79442 || 1997 UX || — || October 22, 1997 || Ondřejov || L. Kotková || — || align=right | 2.3 km || 
|-id=443 bgcolor=#E9E9E9
| 79443 ||  || — || October 23, 1997 || Prescott || P. G. Comba || — || align=right | 2.9 km || 
|-id=444 bgcolor=#C2FFFF
| 79444 ||  || — || October 26, 1997 || La Silla || UDTS || L4 || align=right | 17 km || 
|-id=445 bgcolor=#d6d6d6
| 79445 ||  || — || November 9, 1997 || Goodricke-Pigott || R. A. Tucker || — || align=right | 5.0 km || 
|-id=446 bgcolor=#E9E9E9
| 79446 ||  || — || November 1, 1997 || Xinglong || SCAP || — || align=right | 3.0 km || 
|-id=447 bgcolor=#fefefe
| 79447 ||  || — || November 21, 1997 || Xinglong || SCAP || H || align=right | 1.9 km || 
|-id=448 bgcolor=#E9E9E9
| 79448 ||  || — || November 23, 1997 || Oizumi || T. Kobayashi || — || align=right | 5.5 km || 
|-id=449 bgcolor=#E9E9E9
| 79449 ||  || — || November 20, 1997 || Kitt Peak || Spacewatch || HEN || align=right | 1.4 km || 
|-id=450 bgcolor=#E9E9E9
| 79450 ||  || — || November 23, 1997 || Kitt Peak || Spacewatch || — || align=right | 5.1 km || 
|-id=451 bgcolor=#E9E9E9
| 79451 ||  || — || November 21, 1997 || Kitt Peak || Spacewatch || EUN || align=right | 3.3 km || 
|-id=452 bgcolor=#d6d6d6
| 79452 ||  || — || November 23, 1997 || Kitt Peak || Spacewatch || — || align=right | 4.1 km || 
|-id=453 bgcolor=#E9E9E9
| 79453 ||  || — || November 23, 1997 || Kitt Peak || Spacewatch || — || align=right | 4.6 km || 
|-id=454 bgcolor=#E9E9E9
| 79454 ||  || — || November 24, 1997 || Kitt Peak || Spacewatch || — || align=right | 4.1 km || 
|-id=455 bgcolor=#d6d6d6
| 79455 ||  || — || November 26, 1997 || Socorro || LINEAR || — || align=right | 5.7 km || 
|-id=456 bgcolor=#d6d6d6
| 79456 ||  || — || November 22, 1997 || Kitt Peak || Spacewatch || — || align=right | 3.8 km || 
|-id=457 bgcolor=#E9E9E9
| 79457 ||  || — || December 5, 1997 || Caussols || ODAS || — || align=right | 3.0 km || 
|-id=458 bgcolor=#d6d6d6
| 79458 || 1997 YM || — || December 20, 1997 || Oizumi || T. Kobayashi || KOR || align=right | 3.4 km || 
|-id=459 bgcolor=#d6d6d6
| 79459 || 1997 YS || — || December 20, 1997 || Oizumi || T. Kobayashi || — || align=right | 9.8 km || 
|-id=460 bgcolor=#d6d6d6
| 79460 ||  || — || December 21, 1997 || Oizumi || T. Kobayashi || — || align=right | 6.8 km || 
|-id=461 bgcolor=#d6d6d6
| 79461 ||  || — || December 21, 1997 || Kitt Peak || Spacewatch || THM || align=right | 5.7 km || 
|-id=462 bgcolor=#d6d6d6
| 79462 ||  || — || December 27, 1997 || Kitt Peak || Spacewatch || — || align=right | 3.7 km || 
|-id=463 bgcolor=#d6d6d6
| 79463 ||  || — || December 28, 1997 || Kitt Peak || Spacewatch || — || align=right | 3.9 km || 
|-id=464 bgcolor=#d6d6d6
| 79464 ||  || — || December 29, 1997 || Xinglong || SCAP || — || align=right | 5.3 km || 
|-id=465 bgcolor=#d6d6d6
| 79465 ||  || — || December 27, 1997 || Kitt Peak || Spacewatch || — || align=right | 5.5 km || 
|-id=466 bgcolor=#d6d6d6
| 79466 ||  || — || December 28, 1997 || Kitt Peak || Spacewatch || THM || align=right | 3.7 km || 
|-id=467 bgcolor=#d6d6d6
| 79467 ||  || — || December 31, 1997 || Kitt Peak || Spacewatch || — || align=right | 9.3 km || 
|-id=468 bgcolor=#d6d6d6
| 79468 ||  || — || December 29, 1997 || Kitt Peak || Spacewatch || EOS || align=right | 4.7 km || 
|-id=469 bgcolor=#d6d6d6
| 79469 ||  || — || January 1, 1998 || Kitt Peak || Spacewatch || EOS || align=right | 5.0 km || 
|-id=470 bgcolor=#d6d6d6
| 79470 ||  || — || January 2, 1998 || Kitt Peak || Spacewatch || — || align=right | 3.2 km || 
|-id=471 bgcolor=#d6d6d6
| 79471 ||  || — || January 2, 1998 || Kitt Peak || Spacewatch || — || align=right | 4.4 km || 
|-id=472 bgcolor=#fefefe
| 79472 Chiorny ||  ||  || January 6, 1998 || Sormano || A. Testa, P. Chiavenna || Hmoon || align=right | 2.4 km || 
|-id=473 bgcolor=#d6d6d6
| 79473 ||  || — || January 18, 1998 || Xinglong || SCAP || — || align=right | 5.8 km || 
|-id=474 bgcolor=#d6d6d6
| 79474 ||  || — || January 22, 1998 || Kitt Peak || Spacewatch || 615 || align=right | 3.2 km || 
|-id=475 bgcolor=#d6d6d6
| 79475 ||  || — || January 22, 1998 || Kitt Peak || Spacewatch || EOS || align=right | 3.7 km || 
|-id=476 bgcolor=#d6d6d6
| 79476 ||  || — || January 25, 1998 || Kitt Peak || Spacewatch || — || align=right | 5.7 km || 
|-id=477 bgcolor=#d6d6d6
| 79477 || 1998 CN || — || February 3, 1998 || Kleť || M. Tichý, Z. Moravec || MEL || align=right | 9.2 km || 
|-id=478 bgcolor=#d6d6d6
| 79478 ||  || — || February 6, 1998 || Kleť || Kleť Obs. || EUP || align=right | 8.7 km || 
|-id=479 bgcolor=#d6d6d6
| 79479 ||  || — || February 1, 1998 || Xinglong || SCAP || LIX || align=right | 11 km || 
|-id=480 bgcolor=#d6d6d6
| 79480 ||  || — || February 22, 1998 || Haleakala || NEAT || — || align=right | 7.3 km || 
|-id=481 bgcolor=#d6d6d6
| 79481 ||  || — || March 1, 1998 || La Silla || E. W. Elst || — || align=right | 9.4 km || 
|-id=482 bgcolor=#d6d6d6
| 79482 ||  || — || March 1, 1998 || La Silla || E. W. Elst || 7:4 || align=right | 7.2 km || 
|-id=483 bgcolor=#d6d6d6
| 79483 ||  || — || March 3, 1998 || La Silla || E. W. Elst || — || align=right | 5.9 km || 
|-id=484 bgcolor=#d6d6d6
| 79484 ||  || — || March 18, 1998 || Teide || Teide Obs. || — || align=right | 7.1 km || 
|-id=485 bgcolor=#d6d6d6
| 79485 ||  || — || March 24, 1998 || Caussols || ODAS || ALA || align=right | 16 km || 
|-id=486 bgcolor=#d6d6d6
| 79486 ||  || — || March 24, 1998 || Caussols || ODAS || URS || align=right | 6.7 km || 
|-id=487 bgcolor=#d6d6d6
| 79487 ||  || — || March 20, 1998 || Socorro || LINEAR || ALA || align=right | 8.9 km || 
|-id=488 bgcolor=#d6d6d6
| 79488 ||  || — || March 20, 1998 || Socorro || LINEAR || HYG || align=right | 5.8 km || 
|-id=489 bgcolor=#d6d6d6
| 79489 ||  || — || March 20, 1998 || Socorro || LINEAR || — || align=right | 8.7 km || 
|-id=490 bgcolor=#d6d6d6
| 79490 ||  || — || March 20, 1998 || Socorro || LINEAR || — || align=right | 10 km || 
|-id=491 bgcolor=#d6d6d6
| 79491 ||  || — || March 20, 1998 || Socorro || LINEAR || — || align=right | 6.1 km || 
|-id=492 bgcolor=#d6d6d6
| 79492 ||  || — || March 20, 1998 || Socorro || LINEAR || — || align=right | 4.4 km || 
|-id=493 bgcolor=#d6d6d6
| 79493 ||  || — || March 20, 1998 || Socorro || LINEAR || — || align=right | 3.3 km || 
|-id=494 bgcolor=#d6d6d6
| 79494 ||  || — || March 24, 1998 || Socorro || LINEAR || EOS || align=right | 6.9 km || 
|-id=495 bgcolor=#d6d6d6
| 79495 ||  || — || March 24, 1998 || Socorro || LINEAR || EOS || align=right | 8.7 km || 
|-id=496 bgcolor=#d6d6d6
| 79496 ||  || — || March 24, 1998 || Socorro || LINEAR || — || align=right | 7.7 km || 
|-id=497 bgcolor=#d6d6d6
| 79497 ||  || — || March 24, 1998 || Socorro || LINEAR || — || align=right | 6.7 km || 
|-id=498 bgcolor=#d6d6d6
| 79498 ||  || — || March 31, 1998 || Kleť || Kleť Obs. || — || align=right | 6.6 km || 
|-id=499 bgcolor=#d6d6d6
| 79499 ||  || — || March 26, 1998 || Xinglong || SCAP || ALA || align=right | 9.0 km || 
|-id=500 bgcolor=#d6d6d6
| 79500 ||  || — || March 20, 1998 || Socorro || LINEAR || — || align=right | 5.1 km || 
|}

79501–79600 

|-bgcolor=#d6d6d6
| 79501 ||  || — || March 28, 1998 || Socorro || LINEAR || — || align=right | 8.1 km || 
|-id=502 bgcolor=#d6d6d6
| 79502 ||  || — || March 29, 1998 || Socorro || LINEAR || — || align=right | 5.1 km || 
|-id=503 bgcolor=#d6d6d6
| 79503 ||  || — || April 2, 1998 || Socorro || LINEAR || AEG || align=right | 11 km || 
|-id=504 bgcolor=#d6d6d6
| 79504 ||  || — || April 2, 1998 || Socorro || LINEAR || URS || align=right | 8.1 km || 
|-id=505 bgcolor=#d6d6d6
| 79505 ||  || — || April 2, 1998 || Socorro || LINEAR || MEL || align=right | 5.3 km || 
|-id=506 bgcolor=#fefefe
| 79506 ||  || — || April 23, 1998 || Socorro || LINEAR || PHO || align=right | 3.5 km || 
|-id=507 bgcolor=#fefefe
| 79507 ||  || — || April 24, 1998 || Kitt Peak || Spacewatch || — || align=right | 1.3 km || 
|-id=508 bgcolor=#d6d6d6
| 79508 ||  || — || April 30, 1998 || Anderson Mesa || LONEOS || ALA || align=right | 7.9 km || 
|-id=509 bgcolor=#d6d6d6
| 79509 ||  || — || April 20, 1998 || Socorro || LINEAR || HYG || align=right | 5.9 km || 
|-id=510 bgcolor=#d6d6d6
| 79510 ||  || — || April 24, 1998 || Haleakala || NEAT || — || align=right | 8.8 km || 
|-id=511 bgcolor=#fefefe
| 79511 ||  || — || May 1, 1998 || Socorro || LINEAR || — || align=right | 1.6 km || 
|-id=512 bgcolor=#FA8072
| 79512 ||  || — || May 23, 1998 || Socorro || LINEAR || — || align=right | 2.5 km || 
|-id=513 bgcolor=#fefefe
| 79513 ||  || — || May 22, 1998 || Socorro || LINEAR || — || align=right | 1.6 km || 
|-id=514 bgcolor=#d6d6d6
| 79514 ||  || — || May 26, 1998 || Kitt Peak || Spacewatch || 7:4 || align=right | 10 km || 
|-id=515 bgcolor=#d6d6d6
| 79515 ||  || — || May 22, 1998 || Socorro || LINEAR || 3:2 || align=right | 11 km || 
|-id=516 bgcolor=#fefefe
| 79516 ||  || — || May 23, 1998 || Socorro || LINEAR || — || align=right | 2.0 km || 
|-id=517 bgcolor=#E9E9E9
| 79517 || 1998 MD || — || June 16, 1998 || Woomera || F. B. Zoltowski || — || align=right | 2.5 km || 
|-id=518 bgcolor=#fefefe
| 79518 ||  || — || June 16, 1998 || Woomera || F. B. Zoltowski || — || align=right | 2.6 km || 
|-id=519 bgcolor=#d6d6d6
| 79519 ||  || — || June 18, 1998 || Kitt Peak || Spacewatch || — || align=right | 5.1 km || 
|-id=520 bgcolor=#fefefe
| 79520 ||  || — || June 27, 1998 || Kitt Peak || Spacewatch || — || align=right | 2.2 km || 
|-id=521 bgcolor=#fefefe
| 79521 ||  || — || June 24, 1998 || Socorro || LINEAR || — || align=right | 1.8 km || 
|-id=522 bgcolor=#fefefe
| 79522 ||  || — || June 24, 1998 || Socorro || LINEAR || — || align=right | 2.1 km || 
|-id=523 bgcolor=#fefefe
| 79523 ||  || — || July 20, 1998 || San Marcello || A. Boattini, L. Tesi || — || align=right | 1.2 km || 
|-id=524 bgcolor=#fefefe
| 79524 ||  || — || July 26, 1998 || La Silla || E. W. Elst || — || align=right | 1.4 km || 
|-id=525 bgcolor=#fefefe
| 79525 ||  || — || July 26, 1998 || La Silla || E. W. Elst || — || align=right | 1.8 km || 
|-id=526 bgcolor=#fefefe
| 79526 ||  || — || July 30, 1998 || Reedy Creek || J. Broughton || — || align=right | 2.1 km || 
|-id=527 bgcolor=#fefefe
| 79527 ||  || — || July 26, 1998 || La Silla || E. W. Elst || FLO || align=right | 2.1 km || 
|-id=528 bgcolor=#fefefe
| 79528 || 1998 QG || — || August 17, 1998 || Prescott || P. G. Comba || — || align=right | 1.7 km || 
|-id=529 bgcolor=#fefefe
| 79529 ||  || — || August 17, 1998 || Višnjan Observatory || Višnjan Obs. || — || align=right | 2.3 km || 
|-id=530 bgcolor=#fefefe
| 79530 ||  || — || August 17, 1998 || Reedy Creek || J. Broughton || — || align=right | 1.9 km || 
|-id=531 bgcolor=#fefefe
| 79531 ||  || — || August 17, 1998 || Socorro || LINEAR || — || align=right | 5.4 km || 
|-id=532 bgcolor=#fefefe
| 79532 ||  || — || August 17, 1998 || Socorro || LINEAR || — || align=right | 1.7 km || 
|-id=533 bgcolor=#fefefe
| 79533 ||  || — || August 17, 1998 || Socorro || LINEAR || V || align=right | 1.6 km || 
|-id=534 bgcolor=#fefefe
| 79534 ||  || — || August 17, 1998 || Socorro || LINEAR || NYS || align=right | 1.4 km || 
|-id=535 bgcolor=#fefefe
| 79535 ||  || — || August 17, 1998 || Socorro || LINEAR || — || align=right | 3.0 km || 
|-id=536 bgcolor=#fefefe
| 79536 ||  || — || August 23, 1998 || Xinglong || SCAP || V || align=right | 1.3 km || 
|-id=537 bgcolor=#fefefe
| 79537 ||  || — || August 17, 1998 || Socorro || LINEAR || NYS || align=right | 1.7 km || 
|-id=538 bgcolor=#fefefe
| 79538 ||  || — || August 17, 1998 || Socorro || LINEAR || FLO || align=right | 1.9 km || 
|-id=539 bgcolor=#fefefe
| 79539 ||  || — || August 17, 1998 || Socorro || LINEAR || V || align=right | 2.0 km || 
|-id=540 bgcolor=#fefefe
| 79540 ||  || — || August 17, 1998 || Socorro || LINEAR || V || align=right | 1.9 km || 
|-id=541 bgcolor=#fefefe
| 79541 ||  || — || August 17, 1998 || Socorro || LINEAR || FLO || align=right | 1.4 km || 
|-id=542 bgcolor=#fefefe
| 79542 ||  || — || August 17, 1998 || Socorro || LINEAR || — || align=right | 2.0 km || 
|-id=543 bgcolor=#fefefe
| 79543 ||  || — || August 17, 1998 || Socorro || LINEAR || — || align=right | 2.2 km || 
|-id=544 bgcolor=#fefefe
| 79544 ||  || — || August 17, 1998 || Socorro || LINEAR || FLO || align=right | 1.6 km || 
|-id=545 bgcolor=#fefefe
| 79545 ||  || — || August 17, 1998 || Socorro || LINEAR || — || align=right | 1.6 km || 
|-id=546 bgcolor=#fefefe
| 79546 ||  || — || August 17, 1998 || Socorro || LINEAR || NYS || align=right | 2.7 km || 
|-id=547 bgcolor=#fefefe
| 79547 ||  || — || August 17, 1998 || Socorro || LINEAR || — || align=right | 2.4 km || 
|-id=548 bgcolor=#fefefe
| 79548 ||  || — || August 17, 1998 || Socorro || LINEAR || FLO || align=right | 4.4 km || 
|-id=549 bgcolor=#fefefe
| 79549 ||  || — || August 17, 1998 || Socorro || LINEAR || — || align=right | 2.5 km || 
|-id=550 bgcolor=#fefefe
| 79550 ||  || — || August 17, 1998 || Socorro || LINEAR || — || align=right | 2.5 km || 
|-id=551 bgcolor=#fefefe
| 79551 ||  || — || August 17, 1998 || Socorro || LINEAR || — || align=right | 4.3 km || 
|-id=552 bgcolor=#fefefe
| 79552 ||  || — || August 17, 1998 || Socorro || LINEAR || — || align=right | 2.2 km || 
|-id=553 bgcolor=#E9E9E9
| 79553 ||  || — || August 17, 1998 || Socorro || LINEAR || — || align=right | 2.5 km || 
|-id=554 bgcolor=#fefefe
| 79554 ||  || — || August 17, 1998 || Socorro || LINEAR || NYS || align=right | 1.2 km || 
|-id=555 bgcolor=#fefefe
| 79555 ||  || — || August 17, 1998 || Socorro || LINEAR || — || align=right | 4.1 km || 
|-id=556 bgcolor=#fefefe
| 79556 ||  || — || August 17, 1998 || Socorro || LINEAR || — || align=right | 2.3 km || 
|-id=557 bgcolor=#fefefe
| 79557 ||  || — || August 17, 1998 || Socorro || LINEAR || FLO || align=right | 1.5 km || 
|-id=558 bgcolor=#FA8072
| 79558 ||  || — || August 17, 1998 || Socorro || LINEAR || — || align=right | 2.0 km || 
|-id=559 bgcolor=#fefefe
| 79559 ||  || — || August 17, 1998 || Socorro || LINEAR || V || align=right | 2.5 km || 
|-id=560 bgcolor=#E9E9E9
| 79560 ||  || — || August 28, 1998 || Socorro || LINEAR || BAR || align=right | 2.5 km || 
|-id=561 bgcolor=#fefefe
| 79561 ||  || — || August 30, 1998 || Kitt Peak || Spacewatch || V || align=right | 1.5 km || 
|-id=562 bgcolor=#fefefe
| 79562 ||  || — || August 27, 1998 || Xinglong || SCAP || — || align=right | 2.6 km || 
|-id=563 bgcolor=#fefefe
| 79563 ||  || — || August 24, 1998 || Socorro || LINEAR || — || align=right | 5.5 km || 
|-id=564 bgcolor=#fefefe
| 79564 ||  || — || August 24, 1998 || Socorro || LINEAR || V || align=right | 1.2 km || 
|-id=565 bgcolor=#E9E9E9
| 79565 ||  || — || August 24, 1998 || Socorro || LINEAR || EUN || align=right | 2.3 km || 
|-id=566 bgcolor=#E9E9E9
| 79566 ||  || — || August 24, 1998 || Socorro || LINEAR || JUN || align=right | 2.5 km || 
|-id=567 bgcolor=#fefefe
| 79567 ||  || — || August 24, 1998 || Socorro || LINEAR || — || align=right | 5.8 km || 
|-id=568 bgcolor=#fefefe
| 79568 ||  || — || August 24, 1998 || Socorro || LINEAR || — || align=right | 3.2 km || 
|-id=569 bgcolor=#fefefe
| 79569 ||  || — || August 24, 1998 || Socorro || LINEAR || — || align=right | 2.1 km || 
|-id=570 bgcolor=#fefefe
| 79570 ||  || — || August 24, 1998 || Socorro || LINEAR || — || align=right | 3.7 km || 
|-id=571 bgcolor=#FA8072
| 79571 ||  || — || August 28, 1998 || Socorro || LINEAR || — || align=right | 1.8 km || 
|-id=572 bgcolor=#fefefe
| 79572 ||  || — || August 28, 1998 || Socorro || LINEAR || NYS || align=right | 1.9 km || 
|-id=573 bgcolor=#fefefe
| 79573 ||  || — || August 28, 1998 || Socorro || LINEAR || NYS || align=right | 2.8 km || 
|-id=574 bgcolor=#fefefe
| 79574 ||  || — || August 17, 1998 || Socorro || LINEAR || — || align=right | 4.9 km || 
|-id=575 bgcolor=#fefefe
| 79575 ||  || — || August 17, 1998 || Socorro || LINEAR || FLO || align=right | 1.4 km || 
|-id=576 bgcolor=#FA8072
| 79576 ||  || — || August 28, 1998 || Socorro || LINEAR || — || align=right | 2.1 km || 
|-id=577 bgcolor=#E9E9E9
| 79577 ||  || — || August 26, 1998 || La Silla || E. W. Elst || — || align=right | 3.5 km || 
|-id=578 bgcolor=#fefefe
| 79578 ||  || — || August 26, 1998 || La Silla || E. W. Elst || V || align=right | 1.4 km || 
|-id=579 bgcolor=#fefefe
| 79579 ||  || — || August 26, 1998 || La Silla || E. W. Elst || V || align=right | 1.6 km || 
|-id=580 bgcolor=#fefefe
| 79580 ||  || — || August 26, 1998 || La Silla || E. W. Elst || — || align=right | 2.0 km || 
|-id=581 bgcolor=#fefefe
| 79581 ||  || — || August 25, 1998 || La Silla || E. W. Elst || NYS || align=right | 1.7 km || 
|-id=582 bgcolor=#fefefe
| 79582 ||  || — || August 17, 1998 || Socorro || LINEAR || V || align=right | 1.5 km || 
|-id=583 bgcolor=#fefefe
| 79583 ||  || — || August 17, 1998 || Socorro || LINEAR || NYS || align=right | 1.3 km || 
|-id=584 bgcolor=#fefefe
| 79584 ||  || — || September 13, 1998 || Anderson Mesa || LONEOS || — || align=right | 2.0 km || 
|-id=585 bgcolor=#fefefe
| 79585 ||  || — || September 14, 1998 || Xinglong || SCAP || — || align=right | 1.7 km || 
|-id=586 bgcolor=#fefefe
| 79586 ||  || — || September 14, 1998 || Socorro || LINEAR || ERI || align=right | 3.3 km || 
|-id=587 bgcolor=#fefefe
| 79587 ||  || — || September 14, 1998 || Socorro || LINEAR || V || align=right | 1.3 km || 
|-id=588 bgcolor=#fefefe
| 79588 ||  || — || September 14, 1998 || Socorro || LINEAR || — || align=right | 2.1 km || 
|-id=589 bgcolor=#fefefe
| 79589 ||  || — || September 14, 1998 || Socorro || LINEAR || NYS || align=right | 1.7 km || 
|-id=590 bgcolor=#fefefe
| 79590 ||  || — || September 14, 1998 || Socorro || LINEAR || FLOslow? || align=right | 2.3 km || 
|-id=591 bgcolor=#fefefe
| 79591 ||  || — || September 15, 1998 || Višnjan Observatory || Višnjan Obs. || — || align=right | 2.0 km || 
|-id=592 bgcolor=#fefefe
| 79592 ||  || — || September 14, 1998 || Socorro || LINEAR || — || align=right | 1.7 km || 
|-id=593 bgcolor=#fefefe
| 79593 ||  || — || September 14, 1998 || Socorro || LINEAR || V || align=right | 1.5 km || 
|-id=594 bgcolor=#fefefe
| 79594 ||  || — || September 14, 1998 || Socorro || LINEAR || — || align=right | 2.2 km || 
|-id=595 bgcolor=#fefefe
| 79595 ||  || — || September 14, 1998 || Socorro || LINEAR || V || align=right | 1.8 km || 
|-id=596 bgcolor=#fefefe
| 79596 ||  || — || September 14, 1998 || Socorro || LINEAR || — || align=right | 2.0 km || 
|-id=597 bgcolor=#fefefe
| 79597 ||  || — || September 14, 1998 || Socorro || LINEAR || NYS || align=right | 1.8 km || 
|-id=598 bgcolor=#fefefe
| 79598 ||  || — || September 14, 1998 || Socorro || LINEAR || — || align=right | 1.8 km || 
|-id=599 bgcolor=#fefefe
| 79599 ||  || — || September 14, 1998 || Socorro || LINEAR || V || align=right | 1.9 km || 
|-id=600 bgcolor=#fefefe
| 79600 ||  || — || September 14, 1998 || Socorro || LINEAR || — || align=right | 2.4 km || 
|}

79601–79700 

|-bgcolor=#fefefe
| 79601 ||  || — || September 14, 1998 || Socorro || LINEAR || — || align=right | 1.7 km || 
|-id=602 bgcolor=#E9E9E9
| 79602 ||  || — || September 14, 1998 || Socorro || LINEAR || — || align=right | 2.1 km || 
|-id=603 bgcolor=#fefefe
| 79603 ||  || — || September 14, 1998 || Socorro || LINEAR || — || align=right | 4.4 km || 
|-id=604 bgcolor=#fefefe
| 79604 ||  || — || September 14, 1998 || Socorro || LINEAR || — || align=right | 2.6 km || 
|-id=605 bgcolor=#fefefe
| 79605 ||  || — || September 14, 1998 || Socorro || LINEAR || FLO || align=right | 1.5 km || 
|-id=606 bgcolor=#fefefe
| 79606 ||  || — || September 14, 1998 || Socorro || LINEAR || V || align=right | 1.5 km || 
|-id=607 bgcolor=#E9E9E9
| 79607 ||  || — || September 14, 1998 || Socorro || LINEAR || — || align=right | 2.2 km || 
|-id=608 bgcolor=#fefefe
| 79608 ||  || — || September 14, 1998 || Socorro || LINEAR || — || align=right | 1.8 km || 
|-id=609 bgcolor=#fefefe
| 79609 ||  || — || September 14, 1998 || Socorro || LINEAR || NYS || align=right | 1.9 km || 
|-id=610 bgcolor=#fefefe
| 79610 ||  || — || September 14, 1998 || Socorro || LINEAR || SUL || align=right | 4.5 km || 
|-id=611 bgcolor=#FA8072
| 79611 ||  || — || September 14, 1998 || Socorro || LINEAR || — || align=right | 2.4 km || 
|-id=612 bgcolor=#fefefe
| 79612 ||  || — || September 14, 1998 || Socorro || LINEAR || FLO || align=right | 1.6 km || 
|-id=613 bgcolor=#fefefe
| 79613 ||  || — || September 14, 1998 || Socorro || LINEAR || — || align=right | 3.1 km || 
|-id=614 bgcolor=#fefefe
| 79614 ||  || — || September 14, 1998 || Socorro || LINEAR || NYS || align=right | 2.3 km || 
|-id=615 bgcolor=#fefefe
| 79615 ||  || — || September 14, 1998 || Socorro || LINEAR || NYS || align=right | 2.0 km || 
|-id=616 bgcolor=#fefefe
| 79616 ||  || — || September 14, 1998 || Socorro || LINEAR || — || align=right | 2.2 km || 
|-id=617 bgcolor=#fefefe
| 79617 ||  || — || September 14, 1998 || Socorro || LINEAR || — || align=right | 2.5 km || 
|-id=618 bgcolor=#fefefe
| 79618 ||  || — || September 14, 1998 || Socorro || LINEAR || — || align=right | 2.0 km || 
|-id=619 bgcolor=#fefefe
| 79619 ||  || — || September 14, 1998 || Socorro || LINEAR || — || align=right | 1.5 km || 
|-id=620 bgcolor=#fefefe
| 79620 ||  || — || September 14, 1998 || Socorro || LINEAR || V || align=right | 1.3 km || 
|-id=621 bgcolor=#fefefe
| 79621 ||  || — || September 14, 1998 || Socorro || LINEAR || V || align=right | 1.9 km || 
|-id=622 bgcolor=#fefefe
| 79622 ||  || — || September 14, 1998 || Socorro || LINEAR || — || align=right | 1.6 km || 
|-id=623 bgcolor=#fefefe
| 79623 ||  || — || September 14, 1998 || Socorro || LINEAR || FLO || align=right | 1.8 km || 
|-id=624 bgcolor=#fefefe
| 79624 ||  || — || September 14, 1998 || Socorro || LINEAR || NYS || align=right | 4.0 km || 
|-id=625 bgcolor=#E9E9E9
| 79625 ||  || — || September 14, 1998 || Socorro || LINEAR || — || align=right | 2.4 km || 
|-id=626 bgcolor=#fefefe
| 79626 ||  || — || September 14, 1998 || Socorro || LINEAR || — || align=right | 2.8 km || 
|-id=627 bgcolor=#E9E9E9
| 79627 ||  || — || September 14, 1998 || Socorro || LINEAR || — || align=right | 2.2 km || 
|-id=628 bgcolor=#fefefe
| 79628 ||  || — || September 14, 1998 || Socorro || LINEAR || — || align=right | 1.7 km || 
|-id=629 bgcolor=#fefefe
| 79629 ||  || — || September 14, 1998 || Socorro || LINEAR || — || align=right | 2.0 km || 
|-id=630 bgcolor=#fefefe
| 79630 ||  || — || September 14, 1998 || Socorro || LINEAR || — || align=right | 2.3 km || 
|-id=631 bgcolor=#fefefe
| 79631 ||  || — || September 14, 1998 || Socorro || LINEAR || V || align=right | 1.9 km || 
|-id=632 bgcolor=#fefefe
| 79632 ||  || — || September 14, 1998 || Socorro || LINEAR || V || align=right | 1.4 km || 
|-id=633 bgcolor=#E9E9E9
| 79633 ||  || — || September 14, 1998 || Socorro || LINEAR || — || align=right | 2.6 km || 
|-id=634 bgcolor=#fefefe
| 79634 ||  || — || September 14, 1998 || Socorro || LINEAR || V || align=right | 1.7 km || 
|-id=635 bgcolor=#fefefe
| 79635 ||  || — || September 14, 1998 || Socorro || LINEAR || — || align=right | 3.4 km || 
|-id=636 bgcolor=#E9E9E9
| 79636 ||  || — || September 14, 1998 || Socorro || LINEAR || — || align=right | 2.9 km || 
|-id=637 bgcolor=#fefefe
| 79637 ||  || — || September 14, 1998 || Socorro || LINEAR || FLO || align=right | 1.8 km || 
|-id=638 bgcolor=#fefefe
| 79638 ||  || — || September 14, 1998 || Socorro || LINEAR || — || align=right | 2.0 km || 
|-id=639 bgcolor=#fefefe
| 79639 ||  || — || September 14, 1998 || Socorro || LINEAR || V || align=right | 3.3 km || 
|-id=640 bgcolor=#E9E9E9
| 79640 ||  || — || September 14, 1998 || Socorro || LINEAR || — || align=right | 2.2 km || 
|-id=641 bgcolor=#fefefe
| 79641 Daniloceirani ||  ||  || September 19, 1998 || Campo Catino || F. Mallia, G. Masi || — || align=right | 1.3 km || 
|-id=642 bgcolor=#fefefe
| 79642 ||  || — || September 20, 1998 || Kitt Peak || Spacewatch || — || align=right | 1.7 km || 
|-id=643 bgcolor=#E9E9E9
| 79643 ||  || — || September 16, 1998 || Caussols || ODAS || — || align=right | 3.0 km || 
|-id=644 bgcolor=#fefefe
| 79644 ||  || — || September 17, 1998 || Caussols || ODAS || — || align=right | 1.1 km || 
|-id=645 bgcolor=#fefefe
| 79645 ||  || — || September 19, 1998 || Caussols || ODAS || — || align=right | 2.0 km || 
|-id=646 bgcolor=#fefefe
| 79646 ||  || — || September 22, 1998 || Ondřejov || P. Pravec || — || align=right | 2.6 km || 
|-id=647 bgcolor=#fefefe
| 79647 Ballack ||  ||  || September 22, 1998 || Drebach || G. Lehmann, J. Kandler || NYS || align=right | 1.8 km || 
|-id=648 bgcolor=#E9E9E9
| 79648 ||  || — || September 16, 1998 || Kitt Peak || Spacewatch || — || align=right | 1.7 km || 
|-id=649 bgcolor=#fefefe
| 79649 ||  || — || September 16, 1998 || Kitt Peak || Spacewatch || — || align=right | 3.6 km || 
|-id=650 bgcolor=#fefefe
| 79650 ||  || — || September 16, 1998 || Kitt Peak || Spacewatch || MAS || align=right | 1.6 km || 
|-id=651 bgcolor=#fefefe
| 79651 ||  || — || September 17, 1998 || Kitt Peak || Spacewatch || — || align=right | 1.6 km || 
|-id=652 bgcolor=#fefefe
| 79652 ||  || — || September 20, 1998 || Kitt Peak || Spacewatch || — || align=right | 1.4 km || 
|-id=653 bgcolor=#fefefe
| 79653 ||  || — || September 22, 1998 || Višnjan Observatory || Višnjan Obs. || — || align=right | 2.2 km || 
|-id=654 bgcolor=#fefefe
| 79654 ||  || — || September 23, 1998 || Višnjan Observatory || Višnjan Obs. || V || align=right | 1.9 km || 
|-id=655 bgcolor=#fefefe
| 79655 ||  || — || September 17, 1998 || Anderson Mesa || LONEOS || FLO || align=right | 1.6 km || 
|-id=656 bgcolor=#E9E9E9
| 79656 ||  || — || September 17, 1998 || Anderson Mesa || LONEOS || — || align=right | 2.1 km || 
|-id=657 bgcolor=#fefefe
| 79657 ||  || — || September 17, 1998 || Anderson Mesa || LONEOS || — || align=right | 2.2 km || 
|-id=658 bgcolor=#fefefe
| 79658 ||  || — || September 22, 1998 || Anderson Mesa || LONEOS || ERI || align=right | 4.3 km || 
|-id=659 bgcolor=#E9E9E9
| 79659 ||  || — || September 17, 1998 || Kitt Peak || Spacewatch || ADE || align=right | 3.5 km || 
|-id=660 bgcolor=#fefefe
| 79660 ||  || — || September 18, 1998 || Kitt Peak || Spacewatch || — || align=right | 1.8 km || 
|-id=661 bgcolor=#fefefe
| 79661 ||  || — || September 18, 1998 || Kitt Peak || Spacewatch || FLO || align=right | 1.2 km || 
|-id=662 bgcolor=#fefefe
| 79662 ||  || — || September 19, 1998 || Kitt Peak || Spacewatch || — || align=right | 2.0 km || 
|-id=663 bgcolor=#E9E9E9
| 79663 ||  || — || September 23, 1998 || Kitt Peak || Spacewatch || — || align=right | 2.7 km || 
|-id=664 bgcolor=#fefefe
| 79664 ||  || — || September 26, 1998 || Socorro || LINEAR || — || align=right | 2.6 km || 
|-id=665 bgcolor=#E9E9E9
| 79665 ||  || — || September 26, 1998 || Socorro || LINEAR || HNS || align=right | 3.7 km || 
|-id=666 bgcolor=#fefefe
| 79666 ||  || — || September 26, 1998 || Socorro || LINEAR || — || align=right | 3.9 km || 
|-id=667 bgcolor=#fefefe
| 79667 ||  || — || September 26, 1998 || Socorro || LINEAR || LCI || align=right | 2.1 km || 
|-id=668 bgcolor=#E9E9E9
| 79668 ||  || — || September 21, 1998 || Kitt Peak || Spacewatch || — || align=right | 2.8 km || 
|-id=669 bgcolor=#fefefe
| 79669 ||  || — || September 23, 1998 || Kitt Peak || Spacewatch || V || align=right | 1.7 km || 
|-id=670 bgcolor=#fefefe
| 79670 ||  || — || September 23, 1998 || Xinglong || SCAP || FLO || align=right | 1.9 km || 
|-id=671 bgcolor=#E9E9E9
| 79671 ||  || — || September 23, 1998 || Xinglong || SCAP || — || align=right | 2.5 km || 
|-id=672 bgcolor=#E9E9E9
| 79672 ||  || — || September 23, 1998 || Xinglong || SCAP || MAR || align=right | 2.6 km || 
|-id=673 bgcolor=#fefefe
| 79673 ||  || — || September 24, 1998 || Kitt Peak || Spacewatch || — || align=right | 1.7 km || 
|-id=674 bgcolor=#fefefe
| 79674 ||  || — || September 24, 1998 || Kitt Peak || Spacewatch || FLO || align=right | 1.7 km || 
|-id=675 bgcolor=#E9E9E9
| 79675 ||  || — || September 24, 1998 || Kitt Peak || Spacewatch || — || align=right | 1.9 km || 
|-id=676 bgcolor=#fefefe
| 79676 ||  || — || September 26, 1998 || Kitt Peak || Spacewatch || V || align=right | 1.5 km || 
|-id=677 bgcolor=#E9E9E9
| 79677 ||  || — || September 27, 1998 || Kitt Peak || Spacewatch || — || align=right | 3.2 km || 
|-id=678 bgcolor=#fefefe
| 79678 ||  || — || September 27, 1998 || Kitt Peak || Spacewatch || NYS || align=right | 1.5 km || 
|-id=679 bgcolor=#fefefe
| 79679 ||  || — || September 20, 1998 || Bergisch Gladbach || W. Bickel || — || align=right | 1.8 km || 
|-id=680 bgcolor=#E9E9E9
| 79680 ||  || — || September 25, 1998 || Kitt Peak || Spacewatch || — || align=right | 2.1 km || 
|-id=681 bgcolor=#fefefe
| 79681 ||  || — || September 16, 1998 || Anderson Mesa || LONEOS || — || align=right | 1.6 km || 
|-id=682 bgcolor=#fefefe
| 79682 ||  || — || September 16, 1998 || Anderson Mesa || LONEOS || NYS || align=right | 1.3 km || 
|-id=683 bgcolor=#fefefe
| 79683 ||  || — || September 16, 1998 || Anderson Mesa || LONEOS || — || align=right | 1.7 km || 
|-id=684 bgcolor=#fefefe
| 79684 ||  || — || September 16, 1998 || Anderson Mesa || LONEOS || V || align=right | 1.4 km || 
|-id=685 bgcolor=#fefefe
| 79685 ||  || — || September 16, 1998 || Anderson Mesa || LONEOS || NYS || align=right | 1.6 km || 
|-id=686 bgcolor=#fefefe
| 79686 ||  || — || September 17, 1998 || Anderson Mesa || LONEOS || — || align=right | 2.2 km || 
|-id=687 bgcolor=#fefefe
| 79687 ||  || — || September 17, 1998 || Anderson Mesa || LONEOS || NYS || align=right | 1.4 km || 
|-id=688 bgcolor=#fefefe
| 79688 ||  || — || September 17, 1998 || Anderson Mesa || LONEOS || FLO || align=right | 2.0 km || 
|-id=689 bgcolor=#fefefe
| 79689 ||  || — || September 17, 1998 || Anderson Mesa || LONEOS || — || align=right | 2.2 km || 
|-id=690 bgcolor=#fefefe
| 79690 ||  || — || September 17, 1998 || Anderson Mesa || LONEOS || — || align=right | 1.8 km || 
|-id=691 bgcolor=#fefefe
| 79691 ||  || — || September 17, 1998 || Anderson Mesa || LONEOS || NYS || align=right | 2.1 km || 
|-id=692 bgcolor=#fefefe
| 79692 ||  || — || September 17, 1998 || Anderson Mesa || LONEOS || FLO || align=right | 1.6 km || 
|-id=693 bgcolor=#fefefe
| 79693 ||  || — || September 17, 1998 || Anderson Mesa || LONEOS || — || align=right | 4.1 km || 
|-id=694 bgcolor=#E9E9E9
| 79694 Nanrendong ||  ||  || September 25, 1998 || Xinglong || SCAP || — || align=right | 1.7 km || 
|-id=695 bgcolor=#fefefe
| 79695 ||  || — || September 20, 1998 || La Silla || E. W. Elst || — || align=right | 2.1 km || 
|-id=696 bgcolor=#fefefe
| 79696 ||  || — || September 20, 1998 || La Silla || E. W. Elst || — || align=right | 2.1 km || 
|-id=697 bgcolor=#E9E9E9
| 79697 ||  || — || September 19, 1998 || Socorro || LINEAR || — || align=right | 1.8 km || 
|-id=698 bgcolor=#E9E9E9
| 79698 ||  || — || September 21, 1998 || La Silla || E. W. Elst || — || align=right | 2.3 km || 
|-id=699 bgcolor=#fefefe
| 79699 ||  || — || September 21, 1998 || La Silla || E. W. Elst || MAS || align=right | 2.3 km || 
|-id=700 bgcolor=#E9E9E9
| 79700 ||  || — || September 21, 1998 || La Silla || E. W. Elst || — || align=right | 1.8 km || 
|}

79701–79800 

|-bgcolor=#E9E9E9
| 79701 ||  || — || September 21, 1998 || La Silla || E. W. Elst || — || align=right | 5.3 km || 
|-id=702 bgcolor=#fefefe
| 79702 ||  || — || September 26, 1998 || Socorro || LINEAR || FLO || align=right | 2.5 km || 
|-id=703 bgcolor=#fefefe
| 79703 ||  || — || September 26, 1998 || Socorro || LINEAR || V || align=right | 3.9 km || 
|-id=704 bgcolor=#fefefe
| 79704 ||  || — || September 26, 1998 || Socorro || LINEAR || V || align=right | 1.9 km || 
|-id=705 bgcolor=#fefefe
| 79705 ||  || — || September 26, 1998 || Socorro || LINEAR || MAS || align=right | 1.5 km || 
|-id=706 bgcolor=#fefefe
| 79706 ||  || — || September 26, 1998 || Socorro || LINEAR || — || align=right | 1.6 km || 
|-id=707 bgcolor=#fefefe
| 79707 ||  || — || September 26, 1998 || Socorro || LINEAR || V || align=right | 1.4 km || 
|-id=708 bgcolor=#fefefe
| 79708 ||  || — || September 26, 1998 || Socorro || LINEAR || NYS || align=right | 1.4 km || 
|-id=709 bgcolor=#fefefe
| 79709 ||  || — || September 26, 1998 || Socorro || LINEAR || V || align=right | 1.1 km || 
|-id=710 bgcolor=#fefefe
| 79710 ||  || — || September 26, 1998 || Socorro || LINEAR || V || align=right | 1.7 km || 
|-id=711 bgcolor=#fefefe
| 79711 ||  || — || September 26, 1998 || Socorro || LINEAR || V || align=right | 1.3 km || 
|-id=712 bgcolor=#fefefe
| 79712 ||  || — || September 26, 1998 || Socorro || LINEAR || FLO || align=right | 1.3 km || 
|-id=713 bgcolor=#fefefe
| 79713 ||  || — || September 26, 1998 || Socorro || LINEAR || — || align=right | 2.5 km || 
|-id=714 bgcolor=#fefefe
| 79714 ||  || — || September 26, 1998 || Socorro || LINEAR || V || align=right | 2.2 km || 
|-id=715 bgcolor=#fefefe
| 79715 ||  || — || September 26, 1998 || Socorro || LINEAR || — || align=right | 2.3 km || 
|-id=716 bgcolor=#fefefe
| 79716 ||  || — || September 26, 1998 || Socorro || LINEAR || FLO || align=right | 1.7 km || 
|-id=717 bgcolor=#fefefe
| 79717 ||  || — || September 26, 1998 || Socorro || LINEAR || — || align=right | 2.2 km || 
|-id=718 bgcolor=#fefefe
| 79718 ||  || — || September 26, 1998 || Socorro || LINEAR || V || align=right | 2.6 km || 
|-id=719 bgcolor=#fefefe
| 79719 ||  || — || September 26, 1998 || Socorro || LINEAR || — || align=right | 2.4 km || 
|-id=720 bgcolor=#fefefe
| 79720 ||  || — || September 26, 1998 || Socorro || LINEAR || — || align=right | 5.1 km || 
|-id=721 bgcolor=#FA8072
| 79721 ||  || — || September 26, 1998 || Socorro || LINEAR || — || align=right | 1.8 km || 
|-id=722 bgcolor=#fefefe
| 79722 ||  || — || September 26, 1998 || Socorro || LINEAR || FLO || align=right | 1.4 km || 
|-id=723 bgcolor=#fefefe
| 79723 ||  || — || September 26, 1998 || Socorro || LINEAR || — || align=right | 1.9 km || 
|-id=724 bgcolor=#d6d6d6
| 79724 ||  || — || September 26, 1998 || Socorro || LINEAR || 3:2 || align=right | 11 km || 
|-id=725 bgcolor=#E9E9E9
| 79725 ||  || — || September 26, 1998 || Socorro || LINEAR || — || align=right | 3.0 km || 
|-id=726 bgcolor=#fefefe
| 79726 ||  || — || September 26, 1998 || Socorro || LINEAR || — || align=right | 2.2 km || 
|-id=727 bgcolor=#fefefe
| 79727 ||  || — || September 26, 1998 || Socorro || LINEAR || — || align=right | 2.0 km || 
|-id=728 bgcolor=#fefefe
| 79728 ||  || — || September 26, 1998 || Socorro || LINEAR || NYS || align=right | 1.8 km || 
|-id=729 bgcolor=#fefefe
| 79729 ||  || — || September 26, 1998 || Socorro || LINEAR || MAS || align=right | 1.9 km || 
|-id=730 bgcolor=#fefefe
| 79730 ||  || — || September 26, 1998 || Socorro || LINEAR || FLO || align=right | 2.1 km || 
|-id=731 bgcolor=#fefefe
| 79731 ||  || — || September 26, 1998 || Socorro || LINEAR || — || align=right | 2.8 km || 
|-id=732 bgcolor=#fefefe
| 79732 ||  || — || September 26, 1998 || Socorro || LINEAR || — || align=right | 2.2 km || 
|-id=733 bgcolor=#fefefe
| 79733 ||  || — || September 26, 1998 || Socorro || LINEAR || — || align=right | 4.9 km || 
|-id=734 bgcolor=#fefefe
| 79734 ||  || — || September 26, 1998 || Socorro || LINEAR || — || align=right | 4.6 km || 
|-id=735 bgcolor=#fefefe
| 79735 ||  || — || September 26, 1998 || Socorro || LINEAR || — || align=right | 2.0 km || 
|-id=736 bgcolor=#E9E9E9
| 79736 ||  || — || September 26, 1998 || Socorro || LINEAR || — || align=right | 2.2 km || 
|-id=737 bgcolor=#fefefe
| 79737 ||  || — || September 26, 1998 || Socorro || LINEAR || — || align=right | 1.7 km || 
|-id=738 bgcolor=#fefefe
| 79738 ||  || — || September 26, 1998 || Socorro || LINEAR || V || align=right | 1.9 km || 
|-id=739 bgcolor=#fefefe
| 79739 ||  || — || September 26, 1998 || Socorro || LINEAR || — || align=right | 2.5 km || 
|-id=740 bgcolor=#fefefe
| 79740 ||  || — || September 26, 1998 || Socorro || LINEAR || — || align=right | 2.0 km || 
|-id=741 bgcolor=#fefefe
| 79741 ||  || — || September 26, 1998 || Socorro || LINEAR || — || align=right | 1.9 km || 
|-id=742 bgcolor=#E9E9E9
| 79742 ||  || — || September 26, 1998 || Socorro || LINEAR || — || align=right | 3.3 km || 
|-id=743 bgcolor=#fefefe
| 79743 ||  || — || September 26, 1998 || Socorro || LINEAR || FLO || align=right | 1.6 km || 
|-id=744 bgcolor=#fefefe
| 79744 ||  || — || September 20, 1998 || La Silla || E. W. Elst || NYS || align=right | 1.5 km || 
|-id=745 bgcolor=#fefefe
| 79745 ||  || — || September 20, 1998 || La Silla || E. W. Elst || V || align=right | 1.5 km || 
|-id=746 bgcolor=#fefefe
| 79746 ||  || — || September 26, 1998 || Socorro || LINEAR || — || align=right | 3.0 km || 
|-id=747 bgcolor=#E9E9E9
| 79747 ||  || — || September 26, 1998 || Socorro || LINEAR || — || align=right | 2.5 km || 
|-id=748 bgcolor=#fefefe
| 79748 ||  || — || September 26, 1998 || Socorro || LINEAR || — || align=right | 3.2 km || 
|-id=749 bgcolor=#fefefe
| 79749 ||  || — || September 26, 1998 || Socorro || LINEAR || — || align=right | 2.0 km || 
|-id=750 bgcolor=#fefefe
| 79750 ||  || — || September 21, 1998 || Anderson Mesa || LONEOS || — || align=right | 2.4 km || 
|-id=751 bgcolor=#fefefe
| 79751 ||  || — || September 21, 1998 || La Silla || E. W. Elst || — || align=right | 2.1 km || 
|-id=752 bgcolor=#fefefe
| 79752 ||  || — || September 16, 1998 || Anderson Mesa || LONEOS || — || align=right | 2.0 km || 
|-id=753 bgcolor=#E9E9E9
| 79753 ||  || — || October 13, 1998 || Ondřejov || L. Kotková || — || align=right | 4.6 km || 
|-id=754 bgcolor=#fefefe
| 79754 ||  || — || October 14, 1998 || Caussols || ODAS || NYS || align=right | 1.4 km || 
|-id=755 bgcolor=#fefefe
| 79755 ||  || — || October 14, 1998 || Kitt Peak || Spacewatch || — || align=right | 1.9 km || 
|-id=756 bgcolor=#fefefe
| 79756 ||  || — || October 13, 1998 || Kitt Peak || Spacewatch || V || align=right | 1.9 km || 
|-id=757 bgcolor=#fefefe
| 79757 ||  || — || October 14, 1998 || Xinglong || SCAP || MAS || align=right | 1.9 km || 
|-id=758 bgcolor=#E9E9E9
| 79758 ||  || — || October 13, 1998 || Kitt Peak || Spacewatch || — || align=right | 2.2 km || 
|-id=759 bgcolor=#fefefe
| 79759 ||  || — || October 14, 1998 || Kitt Peak || Spacewatch || NYS || align=right | 1.8 km || 
|-id=760 bgcolor=#fefefe
| 79760 ||  || — || October 14, 1998 || Kitt Peak || Spacewatch || EUT || align=right | 1.2 km || 
|-id=761 bgcolor=#E9E9E9
| 79761 ||  || — || October 14, 1998 || Kitt Peak || Spacewatch || — || align=right | 1.6 km || 
|-id=762 bgcolor=#fefefe
| 79762 ||  || — || October 14, 1998 || Kitt Peak || Spacewatch || V || align=right | 1.5 km || 
|-id=763 bgcolor=#E9E9E9
| 79763 ||  || — || October 14, 1998 || Anderson Mesa || LONEOS || — || align=right | 2.8 km || 
|-id=764 bgcolor=#E9E9E9
| 79764 ||  || — || October 14, 1998 || Anderson Mesa || LONEOS || — || align=right | 3.4 km || 
|-id=765 bgcolor=#fefefe
| 79765 ||  || — || October 14, 1998 || Anderson Mesa || LONEOS || — || align=right | 2.7 km || 
|-id=766 bgcolor=#fefefe
| 79766 ||  || — || October 20, 1998 || Caussols || ODAS || NYS || align=right | 1.4 km || 
|-id=767 bgcolor=#fefefe
| 79767 ||  || — || October 22, 1998 || Caussols || ODAS || NYS || align=right | 1.9 km || 
|-id=768 bgcolor=#E9E9E9
| 79768 ||  || — || October 22, 1998 || Višnjan Observatory || K. Korlević || — || align=right | 2.4 km || 
|-id=769 bgcolor=#fefefe
| 79769 ||  || — || October 22, 1998 || Gekko || T. Kagawa || KLI || align=right | 4.8 km || 
|-id=770 bgcolor=#E9E9E9
| 79770 ||  || — || October 16, 1998 || Kitt Peak || Spacewatch || — || align=right | 1.6 km || 
|-id=771 bgcolor=#fefefe
| 79771 ||  || — || October 17, 1998 || Kitt Peak || Spacewatch || V || align=right | 2.2 km || 
|-id=772 bgcolor=#fefefe
| 79772 ||  || — || October 18, 1998 || Kitt Peak || Spacewatch || — || align=right | 2.2 km || 
|-id=773 bgcolor=#fefefe
| 79773 ||  || — || October 18, 1998 || Kitt Peak || Spacewatch || NYS || align=right | 1.6 km || 
|-id=774 bgcolor=#E9E9E9
| 79774 ||  || — || October 22, 1998 || Višnjan Observatory || K. Korlević || — || align=right | 1.7 km || 
|-id=775 bgcolor=#E9E9E9
| 79775 ||  || — || October 28, 1998 || Socorro || LINEAR || — || align=right | 2.8 km || 
|-id=776 bgcolor=#E9E9E9
| 79776 ||  || — || October 28, 1998 || Socorro || LINEAR || — || align=right | 2.7 km || 
|-id=777 bgcolor=#fefefe
| 79777 ||  || — || October 28, 1998 || Socorro || LINEAR || — || align=right | 3.1 km || 
|-id=778 bgcolor=#E9E9E9
| 79778 ||  || — || October 29, 1998 || Višnjan Observatory || K. Korlević || — || align=right | 2.1 km || 
|-id=779 bgcolor=#E9E9E9
| 79779 ||  || — || October 28, 1998 || Socorro || LINEAR || — || align=right | 1.7 km || 
|-id=780 bgcolor=#fefefe
| 79780 ||  || — || October 28, 1998 || Socorro || LINEAR || V || align=right | 2.9 km || 
|-id=781 bgcolor=#fefefe
| 79781 ||  || — || October 28, 1998 || Socorro || LINEAR || — || align=right | 2.5 km || 
|-id=782 bgcolor=#E9E9E9
| 79782 ||  || — || October 28, 1998 || Socorro || LINEAR || slow? || align=right | 2.2 km || 
|-id=783 bgcolor=#fefefe
| 79783 ||  || — || October 28, 1998 || Socorro || LINEAR || — || align=right | 1.3 km || 
|-id=784 bgcolor=#fefefe
| 79784 ||  || — || October 28, 1998 || Socorro || LINEAR || MAS || align=right | 1.8 km || 
|-id=785 bgcolor=#E9E9E9
| 79785 ||  || — || October 28, 1998 || Socorro || LINEAR || — || align=right | 3.0 km || 
|-id=786 bgcolor=#fefefe
| 79786 ||  || — || October 20, 1998 || Anderson Mesa || LONEOS || V || align=right | 1.5 km || 
|-id=787 bgcolor=#fefefe
| 79787 ||  || — || October 17, 1998 || Anderson Mesa || LONEOS || — || align=right | 1.5 km || 
|-id=788 bgcolor=#E9E9E9
| 79788 ||  || — || October 19, 1998 || Anderson Mesa || LONEOS || RAF || align=right | 2.0 km || 
|-id=789 bgcolor=#E9E9E9
| 79789 ||  || — || November 10, 1998 || Socorro || LINEAR || — || align=right | 4.9 km || 
|-id=790 bgcolor=#fefefe
| 79790 ||  || — || November 11, 1998 || Višnjan Observatory || K. Korlević || — || align=right | 3.0 km || 
|-id=791 bgcolor=#E9E9E9
| 79791 ||  || — || November 8, 1998 || Nachi-Katsuura || Y. Shimizu, T. Urata || — || align=right | 3.7 km || 
|-id=792 bgcolor=#E9E9E9
| 79792 ||  || — || November 9, 1998 || Gekko || T. Kagawa || — || align=right | 2.1 km || 
|-id=793 bgcolor=#E9E9E9
| 79793 ||  || — || November 9, 1998 || Gekko || T. Kagawa || — || align=right | 2.9 km || 
|-id=794 bgcolor=#E9E9E9
| 79794 ||  || — || November 11, 1998 || Nachi-Katsuura || Y. Shimizu, T. Urata || — || align=right | 5.1 km || 
|-id=795 bgcolor=#E9E9E9
| 79795 ||  || — || November 12, 1998 || Oizumi || T. Kobayashi || — || align=right | 4.8 km || 
|-id=796 bgcolor=#E9E9E9
| 79796 ||  || — || November 11, 1998 || Socorro || LINEAR || — || align=right | 6.2 km || 
|-id=797 bgcolor=#fefefe
| 79797 ||  || — || November 10, 1998 || Socorro || LINEAR || MAS || align=right | 1.6 km || 
|-id=798 bgcolor=#fefefe
| 79798 ||  || — || November 10, 1998 || Socorro || LINEAR || NYS || align=right | 1.9 km || 
|-id=799 bgcolor=#E9E9E9
| 79799 ||  || — || November 10, 1998 || Socorro || LINEAR || — || align=right | 1.9 km || 
|-id=800 bgcolor=#fefefe
| 79800 ||  || — || November 10, 1998 || Socorro || LINEAR || — || align=right | 2.6 km || 
|}

79801–79900 

|-bgcolor=#fefefe
| 79801 ||  || — || November 10, 1998 || Socorro || LINEAR || ERI || align=right | 3.6 km || 
|-id=802 bgcolor=#E9E9E9
| 79802 ||  || — || November 10, 1998 || Socorro || LINEAR || — || align=right | 2.7 km || 
|-id=803 bgcolor=#fefefe
| 79803 ||  || — || November 10, 1998 || Socorro || LINEAR || FLO || align=right | 1.9 km || 
|-id=804 bgcolor=#E9E9E9
| 79804 ||  || — || November 10, 1998 || Socorro || LINEAR || — || align=right | 2.2 km || 
|-id=805 bgcolor=#fefefe
| 79805 ||  || — || November 10, 1998 || Socorro || LINEAR || — || align=right | 2.8 km || 
|-id=806 bgcolor=#fefefe
| 79806 ||  || — || November 10, 1998 || Socorro || LINEAR || — || align=right | 2.8 km || 
|-id=807 bgcolor=#E9E9E9
| 79807 ||  || — || November 10, 1998 || Socorro || LINEAR || — || align=right | 2.2 km || 
|-id=808 bgcolor=#E9E9E9
| 79808 ||  || — || November 10, 1998 || Socorro || LINEAR || — || align=right | 1.6 km || 
|-id=809 bgcolor=#fefefe
| 79809 ||  || — || November 10, 1998 || Socorro || LINEAR || NYS || align=right | 1.7 km || 
|-id=810 bgcolor=#E9E9E9
| 79810 ||  || — || November 15, 1998 || San Marcello || M. Tombelli, A. Boattini || — || align=right | 5.9 km || 
|-id=811 bgcolor=#E9E9E9
| 79811 Fengzikai ||  ||  || November 9, 1998 || Xinglong || SCAP || — || align=right | 2.9 km || 
|-id=812 bgcolor=#E9E9E9
| 79812 ||  || — || November 10, 1998 || Socorro || LINEAR || — || align=right | 2.9 km || 
|-id=813 bgcolor=#E9E9E9
| 79813 ||  || — || November 10, 1998 || Socorro || LINEAR || — || align=right | 2.7 km || 
|-id=814 bgcolor=#fefefe
| 79814 ||  || — || November 10, 1998 || Socorro || LINEAR || — || align=right | 2.2 km || 
|-id=815 bgcolor=#fefefe
| 79815 ||  || — || November 10, 1998 || Socorro || LINEAR || NYS || align=right | 1.4 km || 
|-id=816 bgcolor=#E9E9E9
| 79816 ||  || — || November 14, 1998 || Kitt Peak || Spacewatch || — || align=right | 2.8 km || 
|-id=817 bgcolor=#E9E9E9
| 79817 ||  || — || November 15, 1998 || Kitt Peak || Spacewatch || — || align=right | 3.9 km || 
|-id=818 bgcolor=#E9E9E9
| 79818 ||  || — || November 11, 1998 || Anderson Mesa || LONEOS || — || align=right | 1.9 km || 
|-id=819 bgcolor=#fefefe
| 79819 ||  || — || November 15, 1998 || Anderson Mesa || LONEOS || — || align=right | 2.6 km || 
|-id=820 bgcolor=#E9E9E9
| 79820 ||  || — || November 11, 1998 || Socorro || LINEAR || BRG || align=right | 2.8 km || 
|-id=821 bgcolor=#fefefe
| 79821 ||  || — || November 11, 1998 || Socorro || LINEAR || — || align=right | 2.1 km || 
|-id=822 bgcolor=#E9E9E9
| 79822 ||  || — || November 13, 1998 || Socorro || LINEAR || — || align=right | 3.7 km || 
|-id=823 bgcolor=#E9E9E9
| 79823 ||  || — || November 14, 1998 || Socorro || LINEAR || EUN || align=right | 3.7 km || 
|-id=824 bgcolor=#E9E9E9
| 79824 ||  || — || November 11, 1998 || Socorro || LINEAR || HEN || align=right | 1.8 km || 
|-id=825 bgcolor=#fefefe
| 79825 ||  || — || November 18, 1998 || Oizumi || T. Kobayashi || — || align=right | 3.0 km || 
|-id=826 bgcolor=#E9E9E9
| 79826 Finardi ||  ||  || November 17, 1998 || Pianoro || V. Goretti || — || align=right | 2.0 km || 
|-id=827 bgcolor=#fefefe
| 79827 ||  || — || November 18, 1998 || Kushiro || S. Ueda, H. Kaneda || — || align=right | 3.8 km || 
|-id=828 bgcolor=#E9E9E9
| 79828 ||  || — || November 21, 1998 || Catalina || CSS || EUN || align=right | 2.7 km || 
|-id=829 bgcolor=#fefefe
| 79829 ||  || — || November 17, 1998 || Dossobuono || L. Lai || — || align=right | 2.7 km || 
|-id=830 bgcolor=#fefefe
| 79830 ||  || — || November 21, 1998 || Socorro || LINEAR || — || align=right | 2.7 km || 
|-id=831 bgcolor=#E9E9E9
| 79831 ||  || — || November 21, 1998 || Socorro || LINEAR || — || align=right | 4.7 km || 
|-id=832 bgcolor=#E9E9E9
| 79832 ||  || — || November 21, 1998 || Socorro || LINEAR || — || align=right | 2.3 km || 
|-id=833 bgcolor=#E9E9E9
| 79833 ||  || — || November 21, 1998 || Socorro || LINEAR || AGN || align=right | 3.1 km || 
|-id=834 bgcolor=#fefefe
| 79834 ||  || — || November 21, 1998 || Socorro || LINEAR || NYS || align=right | 1.9 km || 
|-id=835 bgcolor=#E9E9E9
| 79835 ||  || — || November 21, 1998 || Socorro || LINEAR || — || align=right | 4.8 km || 
|-id=836 bgcolor=#E9E9E9
| 79836 ||  || — || November 26, 1998 || Goodricke-Pigott || R. A. Tucker || JUN || align=right | 4.7 km || 
|-id=837 bgcolor=#fefefe
| 79837 ||  || — || November 18, 1998 || Socorro || LINEAR || — || align=right | 1.9 km || 
|-id=838 bgcolor=#fefefe
| 79838 ||  || — || November 18, 1998 || Kitt Peak || Spacewatch || FLO || align=right | 1.8 km || 
|-id=839 bgcolor=#fefefe
| 79839 ||  || — || November 20, 1998 || Anderson Mesa || LONEOS || — || align=right | 1.7 km || 
|-id=840 bgcolor=#E9E9E9
| 79840 ||  || — || November 23, 1998 || Anderson Mesa || LONEOS || MAR || align=right | 2.8 km || 
|-id=841 bgcolor=#E9E9E9
| 79841 ||  || — || November 19, 1998 || Kitt Peak || Spacewatch || — || align=right | 2.3 km || 
|-id=842 bgcolor=#fefefe
| 79842 ||  || — || November 19, 1998 || Caussols || ODAS || V || align=right | 1.4 km || 
|-id=843 bgcolor=#E9E9E9
| 79843 ||  || — || November 16, 1998 || Haleakala || NEAT || — || align=right | 2.7 km || 
|-id=844 bgcolor=#E9E9E9
| 79844 ||  || — || November 21, 1998 || Anderson Mesa || LONEOS || EUN || align=right | 3.4 km || 
|-id=845 bgcolor=#fefefe
| 79845 ||  || — || December 7, 1998 || Farra d'Isonzo || Farra d'Isonzo || V || align=right | 1.9 km || 
|-id=846 bgcolor=#E9E9E9
| 79846 ||  || — || December 7, 1998 || Xinglong || SCAP || MAR || align=right | 3.6 km || 
|-id=847 bgcolor=#E9E9E9
| 79847 Colzani ||  ||  || December 7, 1998 || Sormano || F. Manca, A. Testa || EUN || align=right | 3.3 km || 
|-id=848 bgcolor=#E9E9E9
| 79848 ||  || — || December 15, 1998 || Caussols || ODAS || — || align=right | 4.0 km || 
|-id=849 bgcolor=#E9E9E9
| 79849 ||  || — || December 15, 1998 || Caussols || ODAS || — || align=right | 3.3 km || 
|-id=850 bgcolor=#E9E9E9
| 79850 ||  || — || December 8, 1998 || Caussols || ODAS || MRX || align=right | 4.4 km || 
|-id=851 bgcolor=#E9E9E9
| 79851 ||  || — || December 11, 1998 || Kitt Peak || Spacewatch || — || align=right | 2.5 km || 
|-id=852 bgcolor=#E9E9E9
| 79852 ||  || — || December 11, 1998 || Kitt Peak || Spacewatch || — || align=right | 2.8 km || 
|-id=853 bgcolor=#fefefe
| 79853 ||  || — || December 14, 1998 || Socorro || LINEAR || — || align=right | 2.3 km || 
|-id=854 bgcolor=#E9E9E9
| 79854 ||  || — || December 14, 1998 || Socorro || LINEAR || — || align=right | 4.4 km || 
|-id=855 bgcolor=#E9E9E9
| 79855 ||  || — || December 14, 1998 || Socorro || LINEAR || — || align=right | 4.3 km || 
|-id=856 bgcolor=#E9E9E9
| 79856 ||  || — || December 14, 1998 || Socorro || LINEAR || EUN || align=right | 3.6 km || 
|-id=857 bgcolor=#E9E9E9
| 79857 ||  || — || December 14, 1998 || Socorro || LINEAR || — || align=right | 3.6 km || 
|-id=858 bgcolor=#fefefe
| 79858 ||  || — || December 15, 1998 || Socorro || LINEAR || V || align=right | 2.0 km || 
|-id=859 bgcolor=#E9E9E9
| 79859 ||  || — || December 15, 1998 || Socorro || LINEAR || — || align=right | 2.2 km || 
|-id=860 bgcolor=#E9E9E9
| 79860 ||  || — || December 15, 1998 || Socorro || LINEAR || — || align=right | 4.7 km || 
|-id=861 bgcolor=#E9E9E9
| 79861 ||  || — || December 15, 1998 || Socorro || LINEAR || — || align=right | 2.4 km || 
|-id=862 bgcolor=#E9E9E9
| 79862 ||  || — || December 15, 1998 || Socorro || LINEAR || EUN || align=right | 3.8 km || 
|-id=863 bgcolor=#fefefe
| 79863 ||  || — || December 15, 1998 || Socorro || LINEAR || — || align=right | 2.4 km || 
|-id=864 bgcolor=#E9E9E9
| 79864 Pirituba ||  ||  || December 11, 1998 || Mérida || O. A. Naranjo || — || align=right | 3.8 km || 
|-id=865 bgcolor=#fefefe
| 79865 ||  || — || December 8, 1998 || Socorro || LINEAR || PHO || align=right | 2.6 km || 
|-id=866 bgcolor=#E9E9E9
| 79866 || 1998 YY || — || December 16, 1998 || Oizumi || T. Kobayashi || HNS || align=right | 3.6 km || 
|-id=867 bgcolor=#fefefe
| 79867 ||  || — || December 17, 1998 || Baton Rouge || G. Burks, M. Collier || — || align=right | 2.4 km || 
|-id=868 bgcolor=#E9E9E9
| 79868 ||  || — || December 19, 1998 || Oizumi || T. Kobayashi || — || align=right | 3.2 km || 
|-id=869 bgcolor=#E9E9E9
| 79869 ||  || — || December 18, 1998 || Caussols || ODAS || GEF || align=right | 2.8 km || 
|-id=870 bgcolor=#E9E9E9
| 79870 ||  || — || December 21, 1998 || Caussols || ODAS || BRG || align=right | 4.4 km || 
|-id=871 bgcolor=#E9E9E9
| 79871 ||  || — || December 24, 1998 || Catalina || CSS || HNS || align=right | 4.3 km || 
|-id=872 bgcolor=#E9E9E9
| 79872 ||  || — || December 24, 1998 || Prescott || P. G. Comba || GEF || align=right | 2.5 km || 
|-id=873 bgcolor=#E9E9E9
| 79873 ||  || — || December 27, 1998 || Prescott || P. G. Comba || EUN || align=right | 3.3 km || 
|-id=874 bgcolor=#d6d6d6
| 79874 ||  || — || December 22, 1998 || Kitt Peak || Spacewatch || — || align=right | 7.8 km || 
|-id=875 bgcolor=#E9E9E9
| 79875 ||  || — || December 22, 1998 || Kitt Peak || Spacewatch || — || align=right | 3.7 km || 
|-id=876 bgcolor=#E9E9E9
| 79876 ||  || — || December 22, 1998 || Kitt Peak || Spacewatch || — || align=right | 2.9 km || 
|-id=877 bgcolor=#E9E9E9
| 79877 ||  || — || December 22, 1998 || Kitt Peak || Spacewatch || — || align=right | 3.1 km || 
|-id=878 bgcolor=#E9E9E9
| 79878 ||  || — || December 25, 1998 || Kitt Peak || Spacewatch || — || align=right | 2.3 km || 
|-id=879 bgcolor=#E9E9E9
| 79879 ||  || — || December 25, 1998 || Kitt Peak || Spacewatch || — || align=right | 2.4 km || 
|-id=880 bgcolor=#E9E9E9
| 79880 ||  || — || December 25, 1998 || Kitt Peak || Spacewatch || — || align=right | 4.7 km || 
|-id=881 bgcolor=#E9E9E9
| 79881 ||  || — || December 16, 1998 || Anderson Mesa || LONEOS || — || align=right | 2.4 km || 
|-id=882 bgcolor=#E9E9E9
| 79882 ||  || — || December 17, 1998 || Anderson Mesa || LONEOS || EUN || align=right | 3.6 km || 
|-id=883 bgcolor=#E9E9E9
| 79883 ||  || — || January 8, 1999 || Socorro || LINEAR || — || align=right | 7.2 km || 
|-id=884 bgcolor=#E9E9E9
| 79884 ||  || — || January 14, 1999 || Socorro || LINEAR || ADE || align=right | 6.1 km || 
|-id=885 bgcolor=#E9E9E9
| 79885 ||  || — || January 14, 1999 || Višnjan Observatory || K. Korlević || — || align=right | 4.3 km || 
|-id=886 bgcolor=#E9E9E9
| 79886 ||  || — || January 11, 1999 || Kitt Peak || Spacewatch || AGN || align=right | 2.6 km || 
|-id=887 bgcolor=#E9E9E9
| 79887 ||  || — || January 15, 1999 || Kitt Peak || Spacewatch || — || align=right | 4.8 km || 
|-id=888 bgcolor=#E9E9E9
| 79888 ||  || — || January 15, 1999 || Kitt Peak || Spacewatch || ADE || align=right | 6.6 km || 
|-id=889 bgcolor=#E9E9E9
| 79889 Maloka ||  ||  || January 8, 1999 || Mérida || O. A. Naranjo || MRX || align=right | 2.2 km || 
|-id=890 bgcolor=#E9E9E9
| 79890 ||  || — || January 14, 1999 || Socorro || LINEAR || — || align=right | 3.7 km || 
|-id=891 bgcolor=#E9E9E9
| 79891 ||  || — || January 17, 1999 || Višnjan Observatory || K. Korlević || ADE || align=right | 5.6 km || 
|-id=892 bgcolor=#d6d6d6
| 79892 ||  || — || January 18, 1999 || Oizumi || T. Kobayashi || — || align=right | 8.9 km || 
|-id=893 bgcolor=#E9E9E9
| 79893 ||  || — || January 19, 1999 || Caussols || ODAS || GEF || align=right | 2.9 km || 
|-id=894 bgcolor=#d6d6d6
| 79894 ||  || — || January 19, 1999 || Caussols || ODAS || — || align=right | 4.5 km || 
|-id=895 bgcolor=#E9E9E9
| 79895 ||  || — || January 20, 1999 || Oizumi || T. Kobayashi || — || align=right | 7.7 km || 
|-id=896 bgcolor=#E9E9E9
| 79896 Billhaley ||  ||  || January 20, 1999 || Kleť || Kleť Obs. || EUN || align=right | 2.7 km || 
|-id=897 bgcolor=#E9E9E9
| 79897 ||  || — || January 21, 1999 || Višnjan Observatory || K. Korlević || — || align=right | 4.2 km || 
|-id=898 bgcolor=#d6d6d6
| 79898 ||  || — || January 20, 1999 || Caussols || ODAS || — || align=right | 6.5 km || 
|-id=899 bgcolor=#d6d6d6
| 79899 ||  || — || January 20, 1999 || Caussols || ODAS || KOR || align=right | 5.8 km || 
|-id=900 bgcolor=#E9E9E9
| 79900 Coreglia ||  ||  || January 21, 1999 || Monte Agliale || S. Donati || — || align=right | 4.3 km || 
|}

79901–80000 

|-bgcolor=#E9E9E9
| 79901 ||  || — || January 22, 1999 || Višnjan Observatory || K. Korlević || — || align=right | 2.8 km || 
|-id=902 bgcolor=#d6d6d6
| 79902 ||  || — || January 20, 1999 || Caussols || ODAS || — || align=right | 4.9 km || 
|-id=903 bgcolor=#d6d6d6
| 79903 ||  || — || January 21, 1999 || Caussols || ODAS || — || align=right | 4.8 km || 
|-id=904 bgcolor=#d6d6d6
| 79904 ||  || — || January 25, 1999 || Višnjan Observatory || K. Korlević || — || align=right | 6.4 km || 
|-id=905 bgcolor=#E9E9E9
| 79905 ||  || — || January 16, 1999 || Socorro || LINEAR || — || align=right | 4.0 km || 
|-id=906 bgcolor=#E9E9E9
| 79906 ||  || — || January 16, 1999 || Socorro || LINEAR || MAR || align=right | 2.7 km || 
|-id=907 bgcolor=#E9E9E9
| 79907 ||  || — || January 18, 1999 || Socorro || LINEAR || — || align=right | 7.3 km || 
|-id=908 bgcolor=#E9E9E9
| 79908 ||  || — || January 16, 1999 || Kitt Peak || Spacewatch || — || align=right | 5.0 km || 
|-id=909 bgcolor=#d6d6d6
| 79909 ||  || — || January 18, 1999 || Kitt Peak || Spacewatch || TEL || align=right | 2.6 km || 
|-id=910 bgcolor=#E9E9E9
| 79910 ||  || — || January 19, 1999 || Kitt Peak || Spacewatch || JUN || align=right | 2.2 km || 
|-id=911 bgcolor=#E9E9E9
| 79911 || 1999 CK || — || February 4, 1999 || Oizumi || T. Kobayashi || — || align=right | 3.8 km || 
|-id=912 bgcolor=#E9E9E9
| 79912 Terrell ||  ||  || February 10, 1999 || Baton Rouge || W. R. Cooney Jr., E. Kandler || ADE || align=right | 6.3 km || 
|-id=913 bgcolor=#E9E9E9
| 79913 ||  || — || February 9, 1999 || Ondřejov || P. Pravec || CLO || align=right | 3.7 km || 
|-id=914 bgcolor=#E9E9E9
| 79914 ||  || — || February 7, 1999 || Gekko || T. Kagawa || — || align=right | 5.1 km || 
|-id=915 bgcolor=#E9E9E9
| 79915 ||  || — || February 10, 1999 || Socorro || LINEAR || — || align=right | 3.6 km || 
|-id=916 bgcolor=#E9E9E9
| 79916 ||  || — || February 10, 1999 || Socorro || LINEAR || — || align=right | 4.1 km || 
|-id=917 bgcolor=#E9E9E9
| 79917 ||  || — || February 10, 1999 || Socorro || LINEAR || — || align=right | 7.7 km || 
|-id=918 bgcolor=#E9E9E9
| 79918 ||  || — || February 10, 1999 || Socorro || LINEAR || EUN || align=right | 3.3 km || 
|-id=919 bgcolor=#d6d6d6
| 79919 ||  || — || February 10, 1999 || Socorro || LINEAR || — || align=right | 4.4 km || 
|-id=920 bgcolor=#E9E9E9
| 79920 ||  || — || February 10, 1999 || Socorro || LINEAR || CLO || align=right | 6.2 km || 
|-id=921 bgcolor=#E9E9E9
| 79921 ||  || — || February 10, 1999 || Socorro || LINEAR || — || align=right | 4.5 km || 
|-id=922 bgcolor=#E9E9E9
| 79922 ||  || — || February 10, 1999 || Socorro || LINEAR || — || align=right | 3.5 km || 
|-id=923 bgcolor=#d6d6d6
| 79923 ||  || — || February 10, 1999 || Socorro || LINEAR || — || align=right | 7.0 km || 
|-id=924 bgcolor=#E9E9E9
| 79924 ||  || — || February 10, 1999 || Socorro || LINEAR || GEF || align=right | 2.8 km || 
|-id=925 bgcolor=#E9E9E9
| 79925 ||  || — || February 10, 1999 || Socorro || LINEAR || — || align=right | 2.9 km || 
|-id=926 bgcolor=#E9E9E9
| 79926 ||  || — || February 10, 1999 || Socorro || LINEAR || — || align=right | 5.1 km || 
|-id=927 bgcolor=#d6d6d6
| 79927 ||  || — || February 10, 1999 || Socorro || LINEAR || — || align=right | 5.8 km || 
|-id=928 bgcolor=#E9E9E9
| 79928 ||  || — || February 10, 1999 || Socorro || LINEAR || — || align=right | 5.1 km || 
|-id=929 bgcolor=#d6d6d6
| 79929 ||  || — || February 10, 1999 || Socorro || LINEAR || — || align=right | 5.5 km || 
|-id=930 bgcolor=#E9E9E9
| 79930 ||  || — || February 10, 1999 || Socorro || LINEAR || — || align=right | 5.7 km || 
|-id=931 bgcolor=#E9E9E9
| 79931 ||  || — || February 12, 1999 || Socorro || LINEAR || — || align=right | 3.6 km || 
|-id=932 bgcolor=#E9E9E9
| 79932 ||  || — || February 12, 1999 || Socorro || LINEAR || — || align=right | 4.8 km || 
|-id=933 bgcolor=#E9E9E9
| 79933 ||  || — || February 12, 1999 || Socorro || LINEAR || EUN || align=right | 3.3 km || 
|-id=934 bgcolor=#E9E9E9
| 79934 ||  || — || February 12, 1999 || Socorro || LINEAR || — || align=right | 6.0 km || 
|-id=935 bgcolor=#E9E9E9
| 79935 ||  || — || February 12, 1999 || Socorro || LINEAR || — || align=right | 5.7 km || 
|-id=936 bgcolor=#E9E9E9
| 79936 ||  || — || February 12, 1999 || Socorro || LINEAR || — || align=right | 3.5 km || 
|-id=937 bgcolor=#E9E9E9
| 79937 ||  || — || February 12, 1999 || Socorro || LINEAR || — || align=right | 4.8 km || 
|-id=938 bgcolor=#E9E9E9
| 79938 ||  || — || February 12, 1999 || Socorro || LINEAR || — || align=right | 6.4 km || 
|-id=939 bgcolor=#E9E9E9
| 79939 ||  || — || February 10, 1999 || Socorro || LINEAR || — || align=right | 3.6 km || 
|-id=940 bgcolor=#E9E9E9
| 79940 ||  || — || February 10, 1999 || Socorro || LINEAR || — || align=right | 3.7 km || 
|-id=941 bgcolor=#E9E9E9
| 79941 ||  || — || February 10, 1999 || Socorro || LINEAR || — || align=right | 4.2 km || 
|-id=942 bgcolor=#E9E9E9
| 79942 ||  || — || February 10, 1999 || Socorro || LINEAR || — || align=right | 6.1 km || 
|-id=943 bgcolor=#E9E9E9
| 79943 ||  || — || February 10, 1999 || Socorro || LINEAR || CLO || align=right | 5.7 km || 
|-id=944 bgcolor=#E9E9E9
| 79944 ||  || — || February 10, 1999 || Socorro || LINEAR || — || align=right | 5.0 km || 
|-id=945 bgcolor=#d6d6d6
| 79945 ||  || — || February 10, 1999 || Socorro || LINEAR || EOS || align=right | 5.2 km || 
|-id=946 bgcolor=#E9E9E9
| 79946 ||  || — || February 10, 1999 || Socorro || LINEAR || — || align=right | 5.1 km || 
|-id=947 bgcolor=#E9E9E9
| 79947 ||  || — || February 10, 1999 || Socorro || LINEAR || MAR || align=right | 4.0 km || 
|-id=948 bgcolor=#E9E9E9
| 79948 ||  || — || February 10, 1999 || Socorro || LINEAR || — || align=right | 3.9 km || 
|-id=949 bgcolor=#E9E9E9
| 79949 ||  || — || February 10, 1999 || Socorro || LINEAR || GEF || align=right | 3.0 km || 
|-id=950 bgcolor=#E9E9E9
| 79950 ||  || — || February 10, 1999 || Socorro || LINEAR || EUN || align=right | 3.5 km || 
|-id=951 bgcolor=#E9E9E9
| 79951 ||  || — || February 10, 1999 || Socorro || LINEAR || MRX || align=right | 2.6 km || 
|-id=952 bgcolor=#E9E9E9
| 79952 ||  || — || February 10, 1999 || Socorro || LINEAR || — || align=right | 4.8 km || 
|-id=953 bgcolor=#E9E9E9
| 79953 ||  || — || February 10, 1999 || Socorro || LINEAR || — || align=right | 5.4 km || 
|-id=954 bgcolor=#E9E9E9
| 79954 ||  || — || February 10, 1999 || Socorro || LINEAR || — || align=right | 4.4 km || 
|-id=955 bgcolor=#E9E9E9
| 79955 ||  || — || February 12, 1999 || Socorro || LINEAR || — || align=right | 3.3 km || 
|-id=956 bgcolor=#E9E9E9
| 79956 ||  || — || February 12, 1999 || Socorro || LINEAR || — || align=right | 5.6 km || 
|-id=957 bgcolor=#E9E9E9
| 79957 ||  || — || February 12, 1999 || Socorro || LINEAR || DOR || align=right | 5.8 km || 
|-id=958 bgcolor=#d6d6d6
| 79958 ||  || — || February 12, 1999 || Socorro || LINEAR || — || align=right | 4.6 km || 
|-id=959 bgcolor=#E9E9E9
| 79959 ||  || — || February 12, 1999 || Socorro || LINEAR || — || align=right | 3.7 km || 
|-id=960 bgcolor=#E9E9E9
| 79960 ||  || — || February 12, 1999 || Socorro || LINEAR || — || align=right | 5.8 km || 
|-id=961 bgcolor=#E9E9E9
| 79961 ||  || — || February 12, 1999 || Socorro || LINEAR || ADE || align=right | 5.3 km || 
|-id=962 bgcolor=#d6d6d6
| 79962 ||  || — || February 11, 1999 || Socorro || LINEAR || — || align=right | 4.6 km || 
|-id=963 bgcolor=#E9E9E9
| 79963 ||  || — || February 11, 1999 || Socorro || LINEAR || EUN || align=right | 2.9 km || 
|-id=964 bgcolor=#E9E9E9
| 79964 ||  || — || February 11, 1999 || Socorro || LINEAR || EUN || align=right | 3.3 km || 
|-id=965 bgcolor=#E9E9E9
| 79965 ||  || — || February 11, 1999 || Socorro || LINEAR || — || align=right | 2.8 km || 
|-id=966 bgcolor=#E9E9E9
| 79966 ||  || — || February 11, 1999 || Socorro || LINEAR || — || align=right | 3.8 km || 
|-id=967 bgcolor=#E9E9E9
| 79967 ||  || — || February 11, 1999 || Socorro || LINEAR || — || align=right | 5.8 km || 
|-id=968 bgcolor=#d6d6d6
| 79968 ||  || — || February 11, 1999 || Socorro || LINEAR || — || align=right | 6.5 km || 
|-id=969 bgcolor=#C2E0FF
| 79969 ||  || — || February 11, 1999 || Mauna Kea || C. Trujillo, J. X. Luu, D. C. Jewitt || res4:5 || align=right | 125 km || 
|-id=970 bgcolor=#d6d6d6
| 79970 ||  || — || February 8, 1999 || Kitt Peak || Spacewatch || — || align=right | 4.3 km || 
|-id=971 bgcolor=#d6d6d6
| 79971 ||  || — || February 8, 1999 || Kitt Peak || Spacewatch || — || align=right | 4.9 km || 
|-id=972 bgcolor=#d6d6d6
| 79972 ||  || — || February 8, 1999 || Kitt Peak || Spacewatch || — || align=right | 4.8 km || 
|-id=973 bgcolor=#E9E9E9
| 79973 ||  || — || February 9, 1999 || Kitt Peak || Spacewatch || — || align=right | 3.9 km || 
|-id=974 bgcolor=#d6d6d6
| 79974 ||  || — || February 9, 1999 || Kitt Peak || Spacewatch || — || align=right | 4.8 km || 
|-id=975 bgcolor=#d6d6d6
| 79975 ||  || — || February 7, 1999 || Kitt Peak || Spacewatch || K-2 || align=right | 2.3 km || 
|-id=976 bgcolor=#d6d6d6
| 79976 ||  || — || February 12, 1999 || Kitt Peak || Spacewatch || — || align=right | 4.9 km || 
|-id=977 bgcolor=#E9E9E9
| 79977 ||  || — || February 12, 1999 || Anderson Mesa || LONEOS || EUN || align=right | 4.6 km || 
|-id=978 bgcolor=#C2E0FF
| 79978 ||  || — || February 15, 1999 || Mauna Kea || D. C. Jewitt, C. Trujillo, J. X. Luu, S. S. Sheppard || res5:12critical || align=right | 321 km || 
|-id=979 bgcolor=#E9E9E9
| 79979 ||  || — || February 19, 1999 || Oizumi || T. Kobayashi || — || align=right | 6.5 km || 
|-id=980 bgcolor=#E9E9E9
| 79980 ||  || — || February 20, 1999 || Goodricke-Pigott || R. A. Tucker || — || align=right | 4.2 km || 
|-id=981 bgcolor=#E9E9E9
| 79981 ||  || — || February 17, 1999 || Socorro || LINEAR || JUN || align=right | 3.0 km || 
|-id=982 bgcolor=#E9E9E9
| 79982 ||  || — || February 18, 1999 || Socorro || LINEAR || — || align=right | 3.8 km || 
|-id=983 bgcolor=#C2E0FF
| 79983 ||  || — || February 20, 1999 || Kitt Peak || J. X. Luu, C. Trujillo, D. C. Jewitt || cubewano (hot)critical || align=right | 266 km || 
|-id=984 bgcolor=#d6d6d6
| 79984 ||  || — || March 6, 1999 || Kitt Peak || Spacewatch || EOS || align=right | 5.1 km || 
|-id=985 bgcolor=#E9E9E9
| 79985 ||  || — || March 12, 1999 || Kitt Peak || Spacewatch || GEF || align=right | 4.4 km || 
|-id=986 bgcolor=#d6d6d6
| 79986 ||  || — || March 13, 1999 || Goodricke-Pigott || R. A. Tucker || EOS || align=right | 4.3 km || 
|-id=987 bgcolor=#E9E9E9
| 79987 ||  || — || March 14, 1999 || Kitt Peak || Spacewatch || — || align=right | 5.8 km || 
|-id=988 bgcolor=#d6d6d6
| 79988 ||  || — || March 14, 1999 || Kitt Peak || Spacewatch || KOR || align=right | 2.9 km || 
|-id=989 bgcolor=#d6d6d6
| 79989 ||  || — || March 17, 1999 || Caussols || ODAS || HYG || align=right | 5.2 km || 
|-id=990 bgcolor=#d6d6d6
| 79990 ||  || — || March 16, 1999 || Kitt Peak || Spacewatch || — || align=right | 4.7 km || 
|-id=991 bgcolor=#d6d6d6
| 79991 Umbertoleotti ||  ||  || March 19, 1999 || Bologna || San Vittore Obs. || KOR || align=right | 4.5 km || 
|-id=992 bgcolor=#d6d6d6
| 79992 ||  || — || March 17, 1999 || Kitt Peak || Spacewatch || EOS || align=right | 6.7 km || 
|-id=993 bgcolor=#d6d6d6
| 79993 ||  || — || March 17, 1999 || Kitt Peak || Spacewatch || KOR || align=right | 2.6 km || 
|-id=994 bgcolor=#d6d6d6
| 79994 ||  || — || March 17, 1999 || Kitt Peak || Spacewatch || EOS || align=right | 4.9 km || 
|-id=995 bgcolor=#d6d6d6
| 79995 ||  || — || March 19, 1999 || Kitt Peak || Spacewatch || — || align=right | 6.2 km || 
|-id=996 bgcolor=#d6d6d6
| 79996 Vittoria ||  ||  || March 23, 1999 || Bologna || San Vittore Obs. || KOR || align=right | 4.2 km || 
|-id=997 bgcolor=#E9E9E9
| 79997 ||  || — || March 19, 1999 || Socorro || LINEAR || EUN || align=right | 6.8 km || 
|-id=998 bgcolor=#E9E9E9
| 79998 ||  || — || March 19, 1999 || Socorro || LINEAR || DOR || align=right | 7.1 km || 
|-id=999 bgcolor=#d6d6d6
| 79999 ||  || — || March 19, 1999 || Socorro || LINEAR || EOS || align=right | 5.1 km || 
|-id=000 bgcolor=#d6d6d6
| 80000 ||  || — || March 19, 1999 || Socorro || LINEAR || EOS || align=right | 5.8 km || 
|}

References

External links 
 Discovery Circumstances: Numbered Minor Planets (75001)–(80000) (IAU Minor Planet Center)

0079